= Ma (surname) =

- Ma surname in regular script
- Romanization: Ma, Mu, Mah, Mar, Mo (Mandarin, Cantonese)
- Pronunciation: Mǎ (Pinyin); Má, Bé (Pe̍h-ōe-jī)
- Language: Chinese, Korean, Vietnamese, Indonesian

Origin
- Language: Old Chinese
- Derivation: Name of a district
- Meaning: "Horse"

Ma (simplified Chinese: 马; traditional Chinese: 馬; pinyin: Mǎ) is a Chinese family name. The surname literally means 'horse'. As of 2006, it ranks as the 14th most common Chinese surname in mainland China. In 2019 it was the 13th most common surname in mainland China. A 2013 study found it to be the 13th most common, shared by 17,200,000 people or 1.290% of the population, with the province with the most being Henan. It is the 52nd name on the Hundred Family Surnames poem.

From He (surname) adopted name "Ma" (馬), the first word of the district Ma Fu, as their surname. Other romanizations include Mah, Beh, and Mar.

Hui Muslims, Salars, Bonan and Dongxiang people commonly adopted Ma as the translation for their surname Mahmud / Muhammad.

During the Ming dynasty, the Zhengde Emperor had a Uyghur concubine with the surname Ma.

It is not to be confused with the less common surname Má (麻), which means 'hemp'.

== Notable people ==
- Ma Yuan (Han dynasty), Chinese military general and politician of the Eastern Han dynasty
- Ma Zhou, Chinese politician who served as a chancellor during the reign of Emperor Taizong in the Tang dynasty
- Ma He (Mahmud Shams), Chinese admiral and explorer
- Ma Huan, Chinese explorer, translator, and travel writer
- Ma Dong-seok known as Don Lee, American actor
- Ma Tianyu also known Ray Ma, Chinese mandopop singer and actor of Hui ethnicity
- Ma Wing-shing, Hong Kong manhua artist, writer and publisher
- Ma Jian (writer), Chinese-born British writer
- Ma Haide, American doctor
- Ma Hailong, Chinese snooker player
- Ma Xuejun, Chinese discus thrower
- Ma Yunwen, Chinese volleyball player
- Ma Yibo, Chinese field hockey player
- Ma Yanhong, Chinese Olympic athlete
- Ma Qinghua, Chinese motorsports racing driver
- Ma Zhaoxu, Vice Minister of Foreign Affairs of People's Republic of China
- Ma Xiaowei, former Minister of China's National Health Commission
- Ma Wen, Chinese politician, currently serving as the Chair of the National People's Congress Internal and Judicial Affairs Committee
- Ma Wen-chun, Taiwanese politician
- Ma Xiaohui, erhu player and composer from Shanghai, People's Republic of China
- Ma Gui, Chinese martial artist
- Ma Jun, Chinese environmentalist
- Yi Ma, professor in Electrical Engineering and Computer Sciences at the University of California, Berkeley
- Ma Chih-hung, Taiwanese luger
- Ma Yansong, principal architect and founder of MAD Architects
- Ma Liuming, Chinese painter
- Ma Yashu, Chinese actress
- Ma Yili, Chinese actress
- Ma Li (actress), Chinese actress
- Ma Xinrui, Chinese actress and model
- Ma Sichun, Chinese actress
- Ma Ke (actor), Chinese actor
- Ma Prem Hasya, French-American follower of Rajneesh who served as his personal secretary (or chief of staff)
- Ma Anand Sheela, Indian-Swiss woman who was the spokesperson of the Rajneesh movement (also known as the Osho movement)
- Ma Jianzhong, Chinese official and scholar in the late Qing dynasty
- Ma Anliang (1855–1919), Qing dynasty and National Revolutionary Army (NRA) general
- Mah Bow Tan (Ma Baoshan) (born 1948), Singaporean politician
- Ma Chao (176–222), Shu Han general during the Three Kingdoms period
- Ma Che Kong (born 1974), Hong Kong badminton player
- Ma Ching-chiang (Ma Jingqiang), Republic of China Army general
- Ma Dahan, Dongxiang anti-Qing dynasty rebel
- Ma Dai, Shu Han general in the Three Kingdoms period
- Yusuf Ma Dexin (1794–1874), Qing dynasty Islamic scholar
- Edward Ma, member of the electronica band Glitch Mob
- Henry C. Ma, chief commissioner of the Scout Association of Hong Kong
- Ma Hualong (died 1871), head of the Chinese Sufi order Jahriyya and one of the leaders of the Dungan revolt (1862–77)
- Ma Huateng (born 1971), entrepreneur and founder of Tencent
- Jack Ma (or Ma Yun, born 1964), internet entrepreneur and executive chairman of Alibaba Group
- Ma Yinchu, Chinese economist
- James Ma (born 1993), Thai actor
- Jeff Ma, former member of the MIT Blackjack Team
- Ma Jianrong, Chinese executive in the textile industry; chairman of Shenzhou International Group Holdings Limited
- Ma Jin (born 1988), badminton player
- Ma Jun (fl. 220–265), Cao Wei mechanical engineer and official in the Three Kingdoms period
- Ma Jun (born c. 1968), environmentalist, non-fiction writer and journalist
- Ma Junren (born 1944), Chinese track and field coach
- Ma Laichi (1681–1766), founder of the Chinese Sufi Khufiyya movement
- Ma Lik (Ma Li) (1952–2007), former Hong Kong Legislative Councillor and chairman of the pro-Beijing Democratic Alliance for Betterment of Hong Kong (DAB)
- Ma Zhong, Chinese military general and politician of the state of Shu Han during the Three Kingdoms period of China
- Ma Lin (table tennis), retired Chinese table tennis player and the current Chinese Women's Team Head Coach
- Ma Wenge, Chinese table tennis player
- Ma Yexin, Chinese tennis player
- Ma Linyi (1864–1938), Minister of Education in Gansu province under the Nationalist Government
- Ma Liyan (born 1968), Chinese female long-distance runner
- Ma Zhenxia, Chinese racewalker
- Ma Long (born 1988), table tennis player, ranked first as of March 2013 in the International Table Tennis Federation
- Mary Ma (1952/53–2019), businesswoman
- Ma Mingyu (born 1972), Chinese footballer and national team captain in the 2002 FIFA World Cup
- Ma Mingxin (1719–1781), founder of the Chinese Sufi order Jahriyya
- Ma Ning (referee), Chinese football referee
- Ma Ning (field hockey), Chinese field hockey player
- Ma Qinghua (born 1987), racing driver
- Qingyun Ma (born 1965), Chinese architect
- Ma Qixi (1857–1914), founder of the Xidaotang
- Rebecca Ma, American businesswoman, socialite, and social media personality
- Ma Ruifang (born 1942), author, scholar and professor at Shandong University's School of Literature
- Ma Sanli (1914–2003), comedian
- Shang-keng Ma (1940–1983), Chinese theoretical physicist
- Ma Shaowu (1874–1937), member of the Xinjiang clique in the ROC (1912–49) era
- Ma Shenglin (died 1871), Qing dynasty rebel who participated in the Panthay Rebellion
- Ma Sicong (1912–1987), violinist and composer
- Ma Su (190–228), Shu Han general in the Three Kingdoms period
- Ma Teng (died 211), Eastern Han dynasty warlord
- Ma Liang, official serving under the warlord during the late Eastern Han dynasty of China
- Tzi Ma (Ma Zhi) (born 1962), Chinese American actor
- Ma Wanfu (1849–1934), Dongxiang anti-Qing dynasty rebel and founder of the Yihewani movement
- Ma Weiming (born 1960), Chinese naval engineer
- Ma Xiaochun (born 1964), professional weiqi player
- Ma Xiaonian (born 1945), physician and sexologist
- Ma Xinyi (1821–1870), Qing dynasty official and general
- Ma Yansong (born 1975), architect
- Ma Ying-jeou (Ma Yingjiu) (born 1950), President of the Republic of China
- Yo-Yo Ma (Ma Youyou) (born 1955), French American cellist
- Ma Yuan (14 BC – 49 AD), Eastern Han dynasty general
- Ma Yuan (c. 1160–65 – 1225), Song dynasty painter
- Ma Yuanzhang, member of the Chinese Sufi order Jahriyya
- Ma Yutao (born 1936), Chinese opera singer and military general
- Ma Zhanhai (died 1932), NRA general who participated in the Sino-Tibetan War
- Ma Zhanshan (1885–1950), NRA general who fought in the Second Sino-Japanese War
- Banharn Silpa-archa (Ma Dexiang) (1932–2016), Prime Minister of Thailand from 1995 to 1996 (archa in Thai means "horse")
- Empress Ma (Han dynasty), empress during the Eastern Han dynasty
- Empress Ma (Hongwu), member of the House of Zhu, Hongwu Emperor's wife
- Empress Ma (Jianwen), Jianwen Emperor's wife
- Macyarin (born 1996), Taiwanese singer and member of AKB48
- Ma clique, in the Qing dynasty and the Republic of China (1912–49) era
- Mokcheon Ma clan, one of the Korean clans
- Sanggok Ma clan, one of the Korean clans
- Hyejong of Goryeo, known as Wang Mu, the second king of the Goryeo dynasty of Korea
- Mu of Balhae, known as King Mu, the second king of the Balhae
- Mu of Baekje, the 30th King of Baekje, one of the Three Kingdoms of Korea
- Mah Chonggi, Korean poet
- Ma Kwang-soo, South Korean poet, professor in Korean literature, novelist and essayist
- Ma Jae-yoon, a.k.a. Savior, former professional South Korean e-sports gamer of the real-time strategy game StarCraft
- Ma Jung-kil, South Korean sidearm relief pitcher
- Ma Sang-hoon, South Korean professional footballer
- Ma Hae-young, retired South Korean professional baseball infielder
- Dong Hyun Ma, South Korean mixed martial artist who most recently competed in the UFC's lightweight division
- Yoo Da-in, born Ma Young-seon, South Korean actress
- Ma Chul-jun, South Korean former footballer and manager
- Ma Bufang (1903–1975)
- Ma Bukang
- Ma Buqing (1901–1977)
- Ma Biao
- Ma Chengxiang (1914–1991)
- Ma Dunjing (1906–1972)
- Ma Dunjing (1910–2003)
- Ma Fulu (1854–1900)
- Ma Fushou
- Ma Fuxiang (1876–1932)
- Ma Fuxing (1864–1924)
- Ma Fuyuan
- Ma Guoliang
- Ma Haiyan (1837–1900)
- Ma Hongbin (1884–1960)
- Ma Hongkui (1892–1970)
- Ma Hushan (1910–1954)
- Ma Jiyuan (1921–2012)
- Ma Lin (1873–1945)
- Ma Qi (1869–1931)
- Ma Qianling (1824–1909)
- Ma Julong
- Ma Sheng-kuei (Ma Shenggui)
- Ma Shouzhen (1548–1604)
- Ma Zhan'ao (1830–1886)
- Ma Zhancang
- Ma Zhongying (fl. 1930s)
- Ma Xizhen
- Bertha Hosang Mah (1896–1959), Canadian student
- Theresa Mah, Democratic member of the Illinois House of Representatives
- Michelle Mah, Korean-American chef
- Leslie Mah, American musician
- Bowinn Ma, Canadian politician
- Fiona Ma (born 1966), American politician and member of the California State Assembly
- Frederick Ma, Chinese businessman from Hong Kong
- Geoffrey Ma (born 1956), judge from Hong Kong, China
- Jack Ma or Ma Yun (born 1964), Chinese business magnate, philanthropist, internet and technology entrepreneur, founder and executive chairman of Alibaba Group
- Jaeson Ma, American entrepreneur
- James Ma (born 1993), Thai actor
- Jie Ma, traditional Chinese musician
- Kenneth Ma (born 1974), Chinese Canadian actor
- Qingyun Ma (born 1965), Chinese architect
- Sire Ma (born 1987), Chinese actress
- Sora Ma (born 1984), Malaysian born Singaporean actress
- Stanley Ma (born 1950), Canadian-Quebecois businessman of Chinese origin and founder and President of MTY Food Group
- Steve Ma (born 1962), Chinese actor from Taiwan
- Steven Ma (born 1971), Chinese actor and singer
- Tzi Ma (born 1962), Chinese-American character actor
- Wu Ma (1942–2014), Chinese actor, director, producer
- Victor Ma, Chinese-American singer, songwriter, rapper, and actor

== Westernized-style surname ==
- Bertha Hosang Mah (1896–1959), Canadian student
- Theresa Mah, Democratic member of the Illinois House of Representatives
- Michelle Mah, Korean-American chef
- Leslie Mah, American musician
- Bowinn Ma, Canadian politician
- Fiona Ma (born 1966), American politician and member of the California State Assembly
- Frederick Ma, Chinese businessman from Hong Kong
- Geoffrey Ma (born 1956), judge from Hong Kong, China
- Jaeson Ma, American entrepreneur
- James Ma (born 1993), Thai actor
- Jie Ma, traditional Chinese musician
- Jianjie Ma, American researcher and academic
- Kenneth Ma (born 1974), Chinese Canadian actor
- Michael Ma, Canadian politician
- Qingyun Ma (born 1965), Chinese architect
- Sire Ma (born 1987), Chinese actress
- Sora Ma (born 1984), Malaysian born Singaporean actress
- Stanley Ma (born 1950), Canadian-Quebecois businessman of Chinese origin and founder and President of MTY Food Group
- Steve Ma (born 1962), Chinese actor from Taiwan
- Steven Ma (born 1971), Chinese actor and singer
- Tzi Ma (born 1962), Chinese-American character actor
- Wu Ma (1942–2014), Chinese actor, director, producer
- Victor Ma, Chinese-American singer, songwriter, rapper, and actor
- Wenbo Ma FRS, plant pathologist

== See also ==
- List of common Chinese surnames
- Mar (surname)
- Mars (surname)
