= Jangheung Ma clan =

Korean clan from South Jeolla Province

- Country: Korea
- Current region: Jangheung County
- Founder: Ma Ryeo
- Connected members: Ma Jung-kil; Ma Hae-young
- Website: http://www.jhma.net/

Jangheung Ma clan (Korean: 장흥 마씨; Hanja: 長興 馬氏) is one of the Korean clans. Their Bon-gwan is in Jangheung County, South Jeolla Province. Jangheung Ma clan was divided from Mokcheon Ma clan and both were sorted as the same kind of clans. According to the research held in 2000, the number of the Jangheung Ma clan was 28337. Ma clan began when Ma Wan (Hanja: 馬浣) became the member of Gojoseon with Gija. Their founder was Ma Ryeo who was one of the leading members of Baekje’s foundation. Ma Ryeo was a descendant of Ma Wan (Hanja: 馬浣).

== See also ==
- Korean clan names of foreign origin
