= List of erhu players =

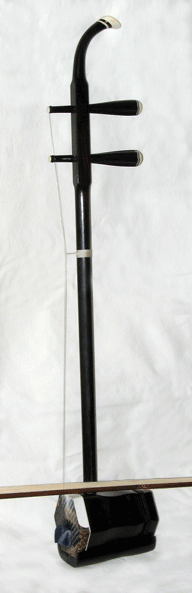
The erhu

This is a list of erhu performers and contains a non-exhaustive list of notable players of the erhu, a bowed musical instrument with two strings.

== Erhu performers ==
The list is organized alphabetically.

- Abing (c. 1893-1950)
- Alan Dawa Dolma
- Jiebing Chen
- Chthonic
- George Gao or Gao Shaoqing
- Guo Gan
- Tina Guo
- The Hsu-nami
- Eyvind Kang
- Nicole Ge Li
- Liu Mingyuan (1931–1996)
- Liu Tianhua (1895–1932)
- Ma Xiaohui
- Min Huifen (1945–2014)
- Shen Sinyan
- Sun Huang
- Ubiquitous Synergy Seeker
- Francis Wong
- Teresa Wong
- Zhou Yu
- Dinesh Subasinghe
