= Hae-young =

- Hangul: 해영
- RR: Haeyeong
- MR: Haeyŏng

Hae-young (Korean: 해영), also spelt Hae-yeong, is a Korean given name. As of 2026, the name ranked 2,286th out of 36,179 male names and 1,110th out of 28,726 female names. A total of 243 people, consisting of 78 males and 165 females, were born with the name from 2008 to 2026.

== People ==
- Park Hae-young, South Korean screenwriter
- Lee Hae-young, South Korean film director and screenwriter
- Yoon Hae-young, South Korean actress
- Lee Hae-young (actor), South Korean actor
- Hae-Young Kee, Korean-Canadian physicist
- Ma Hae-young, retired South Korean professional baseball infielder
- Mun Hae-yeong, South Korean rower

== Fictional characters ==
- Oh Hae-young, portrayed by Seo Hyun-jin, female protagonist of 2016 South Korean drama Another Miss Oh
- Park Hae-young, portrayed by Lee Je-hoon, male protagonist of 2016 South Korean drama Signal
- Son Hae-young, portrayed by Shin Min-a, female protagonist of 2024 South Korean drama No Gain No Love

== See also ==
- List of Korean given names
