= Sam Beall =

American chef (1976–2016)

- Born: Samuel Erasmus Beall IV; August 21, 1976; Knoxville, Tennessee, U.S.
- Died: February 25, 2016 (aged 39); Beaver Creek, Colorado, U.S.
- Education: University of Tennessee, California Culinary Academy
- Occupations: Chef and restaurateur
- Years active: 2000–2016
- Known for: The Blackberry Farm Cookbook (2009), The Foothills Cuisine of Blackberry Farm (2012)
- Spouse: Mary Celeste Beall
- Children: 5

Samuel Erasmus Beall IV (August 21, 1976 – February 25, 2016) was an American chef and restaurateur. He ran Blackberry Farm in Walland, Tennessee, a Beall family business which has been rated as among the best resorts in North America. He was a major proponent of having American restaurants focus on regional cuisine for their menus.

== Early life and education ==
Beall was born in 1976, in Knoxville, Tennessee, to Samuel E. (Sandy) Beall III, the founder of the Ruby Tuesday restaurant chain, and his wife, Kreis. The couple bought the property, located in the foothills of the Great Smoky Mountains, in December 1976 and ran it as a small country inn. Sam, who was four months old at the time of the purchase, spent his earliest years on the farm. When his father sold the restaurant chain in 1982, the family moved to Mobile, Alabama, where he was raised.

As a young man, Beall studied first at Hampden-Sydney College. and graduated from the University of Tennessee.

== Career ==
After graduating, Beall moved to California, where he studied at the California Culinary Academy, following which he worked at the Ritz-Carlton Hotel in San Francisco, and went on to study French cuisine at The French Laundry in Yountville, California.

Returning to his family home, Beall took over management of the farm and built the Blackberry Farm Inn into a culinary destination for "farm-to-table cooking" focusing on what he called foothills cuisine. He recruited kitchen staff and developed the attached FarmStead to produce ingredients, such as heirloom vegetables, charcuterie, and cheeses, for the food offered at the inn.

== Death ==
Beall died in 2016, at the age of 39, of injuries he suffered from an accident while skiing at Beaver Creek, Colorado. The local coroner determined that he had hit a wooden sign post located between the ski runs and died of blunt force trauma to the chest. After his death, his widow, Mary Celeste Beall, assumed management of the inn.

== Works ==
- The Blackberry Farm Cookbook: Four Seasons of Great Food and the Good Life (2009).
- The Foothills Cuisine of Blackberry Farm: Recipes and Wisdom from Our Artisans, Chefs, and Smoky Mountain Ancestors with Marah Stets, Clarkson Potter, New York (2012).
