= Xujiacao Changle station =

Ningbo Metro station

Coordinates: 29.8901°N 121.4926°E

Xujiacao Changle 徐家漕长乐
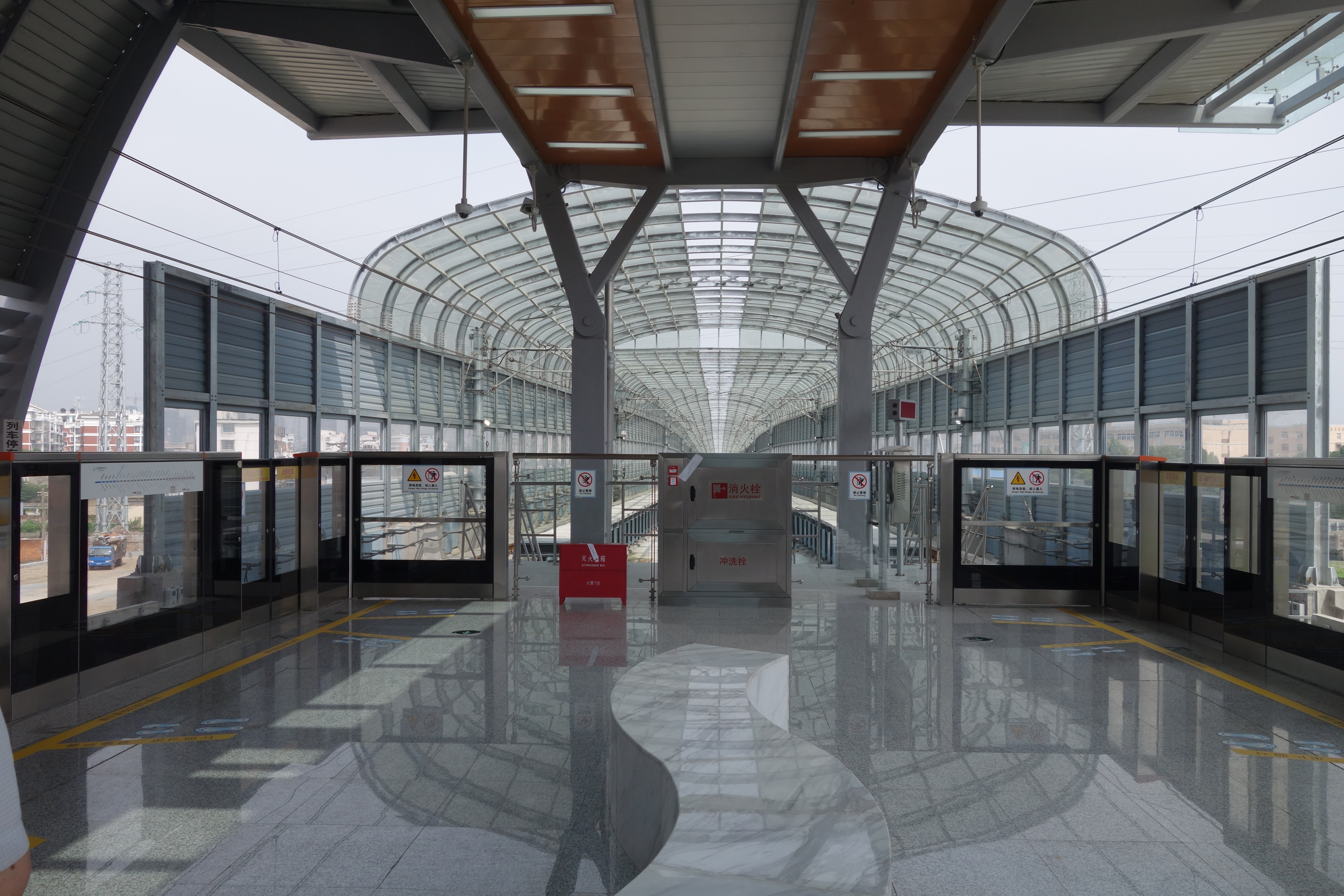

General information
- Location: Haishu District, Ningbo, Zhejiang; China
- Operated by: Ningbo Rail Transit Co. Ltd.
- Line(s): Line 1
- Platforms: 2 (1 island platform)

Construction
- Structure type: Elevated

History
- Opened: 30 May 2014

Services
Preceding station	Ningbo Rail Transit	Following station
Lugang towards Gaoqiao West	Line 1	Wangchun Bridge towards Xiapu

Xujiacao Changle Station (simplified Chinese: 徐家漕长乐站; traditional Chinese: 徐家漕長樂站; pinyin: Xújiācáo Chánglè Zhàn) is a station on Line 1 of the Ningbo Rail Transit that started operations on 30 May 2014. It is situated over Wangchun Road (Chinese: 望春路) and Xinyuan Road (Chinese: 新园路) in Haishu District of Ningbo City, Zhejiang Province, eastern China.

== Exits ==
Exit number	Exit location
Exit A	Wangchun Road
Exit B	Wangchun Road, Xiangcheng Avenue
Exit C	Wangchun Road, Xinyuan Road
