= California Culinary Academy =

Culinary school in San Francisco, California

Coordinates: 37°45′55″N 122°24′11″W

- Type: for-profit college
- Active: 1977–2017
- President: Peter Lee
- Location: San Francisco, United States
- Campus: City

The California Culinary Academy (CCA) was a for-profit school, and an affiliate of Le Cordon Bleu located in San Francisco, California. Danielle Carlisle established the school in 1977 to train chefs using the European education model. The original location on the corner of Fremont and Howard Street in the South of Market area of San Francisco, was located in the remodeled, top-floor, cafeteria in the Del Monte headquarters. The academy trained more than 15,000 people for restaurant careers through its 30-week baking and pastry chef program and 16-month culinary arts degree program. It was purchased by Career Education Corporation in 1999.

== History ==
The school was established in 1977. The original school was accredited by the American Culinary Federation. In 1999, the California Culinary Academy was sold. Curriculum, instruction requirements for entry and graduation was altered. In mid-2007 the San Francisco Weekly claimed that the school preyed on students, misrepresenting the jobs and wages that were available to graduates, and the ability of graduates to service their student loan obligations after graduation. Soon thereafter, a class action lawsuit (Amador v. California Culinary Academy) was filed. One allegation was that the school inflated job placement rates by counting as successful post-culinary school placements jobs that would have been available without going to culinary school at all. The complaint in its various iterations, with detailed allegations, is available from the San Francisco Superior Court, Case No. CGC-07-467710.

Later individual cases filed in 2011 (still ongoing as of September 2012), e.g., Abarca v. California Culinary Academy Case Number: CGC-11-511469, alleged the same problems. These suits cited data tending to provide substantial support for the allegation that CCA led students to believe they would be chefs after graduation when, the complaint alleges, graduates start in entry-level jobs available to those without culinary degrees, making culinary school an economically irrational purchase. In December 2010 CCA owner Career Education Corporation ("CEC") agreed to settle the class action for $40 million plus about $1.7 million in forgiveness of amounts alleged owed to the school or CEC. That settlement received final approval from the San Francisco Superior Court on or about April 19, 2012, and that approval became the final judgement of the court in late June 2012.

In 2012, while the class settlement was pending, new questions of more recent placement rate wrongdoing were raised by the school's own accreditors. The school restaurant has been closed and 25% of the faculty has been laid off effective December 31, 2012 due to drastically declining enrollment.

Attorney Ray Gallo, the attorney who represented the plaintiffs, has offered the following opinion: "It is a ridiculous business decision to attend one of these schools." "The whole thing doesn’t make economic sense. They know it and they don’t tell you."

== Accreditation ==
California Culinary Academy was nationally accredited by the Accrediting Commission of Career Schools and Colleges of Technology (ACCSCT). It did not have regional accreditation; thus, most regionally accredited or traditional universities and colleges are reluctant to accept its credits for transfer and many do not recognize its undergraduate degrees for entry into graduate programs.

== Programs ==
- Culinary Arts Program—Associate of occupational studies and culinary certificate
- Baking & Pastry Arts Program

== Campus ==
California Culinary Academy's original location was 215 Fremont St. The second campus (the North Campus), was located at 625 Polk Street in downtown San Francisco. The final main campus was in the Potrero Hill neighborhood of the city at 350 Rhode Island Street. The facilities included professional kitchens, student-staffed restaurants, lecture classrooms, a library, and a culinary laboratory.

== Alumni ==
Alumni of California Culinary Academy include:

- Charlie Trotter, 10x James Beard Award-winning chef
- Sam Beall, chef and proprietor of the Blackberry Farm Inn in Tennessee and proponent of regional cuisine
- Juan-Carlos Cruz, former celebrity chef on the Food Network
- Cheryl Forberg, James Beard Award-winning chef, and the nutritionist for The Biggest Loser
- Michelle Mah, Chef de Cuisine Wo Hing General Store, San Francisco, CA
- John Mitzewich, video blogger, YouTube chef
- Chef Wan
- Alessandro Stratta
- Ron Siegel
