= Plaridel =

Plaridel can refer to:

- the penname of Marcelo H. del Pilar
- Arellano University – Plaridel Campus
- J. Plaridel Silvestre, Scouting notable, awardee of the Bronze Wolf in 1977
- The name of three places in the Philippines:
  - Plaridel, Bulacan
  - Plaridel, Misamis Occidental
  - Plaridel, Quezon
- Plaridel Airport
- Port of Plaridel
