= Forberg =

Forberg is a surname. Notable people with the surname include:

- Carl Forberg (1911–2000), American race car driver
- Cheryl Forberg, American chef
- Friedrich Karl Forberg (1770-1848), German philosopher and classical scholar
- Leif Erik Forberg (born 1950), Norwegian television presenter
