= Yuehu =

Yuehu may refer to:

== Places ==
- Lake Yue (月湖), in the city of Ningbo, in the Zhejiang province of China (its name translates as "Moon Lake")
- Yuehu District (月湖区), in Yingtan, Jiangxi, China
- Yuehu Subdistrict, Changsha (月湖街道), a subdistrict of Kaifu District, Changsha, China
- Yuehu Park (月湖公园), a park in Kaifu District, Changsha
- Yuehu Mosque

== Musical instruments ==
- Gaohu, also known as Yuehu (粤胡), a bowed string instrument used in Cantonese music
