= Liangzhu Culture Park =

Theme park in Ningbo, China

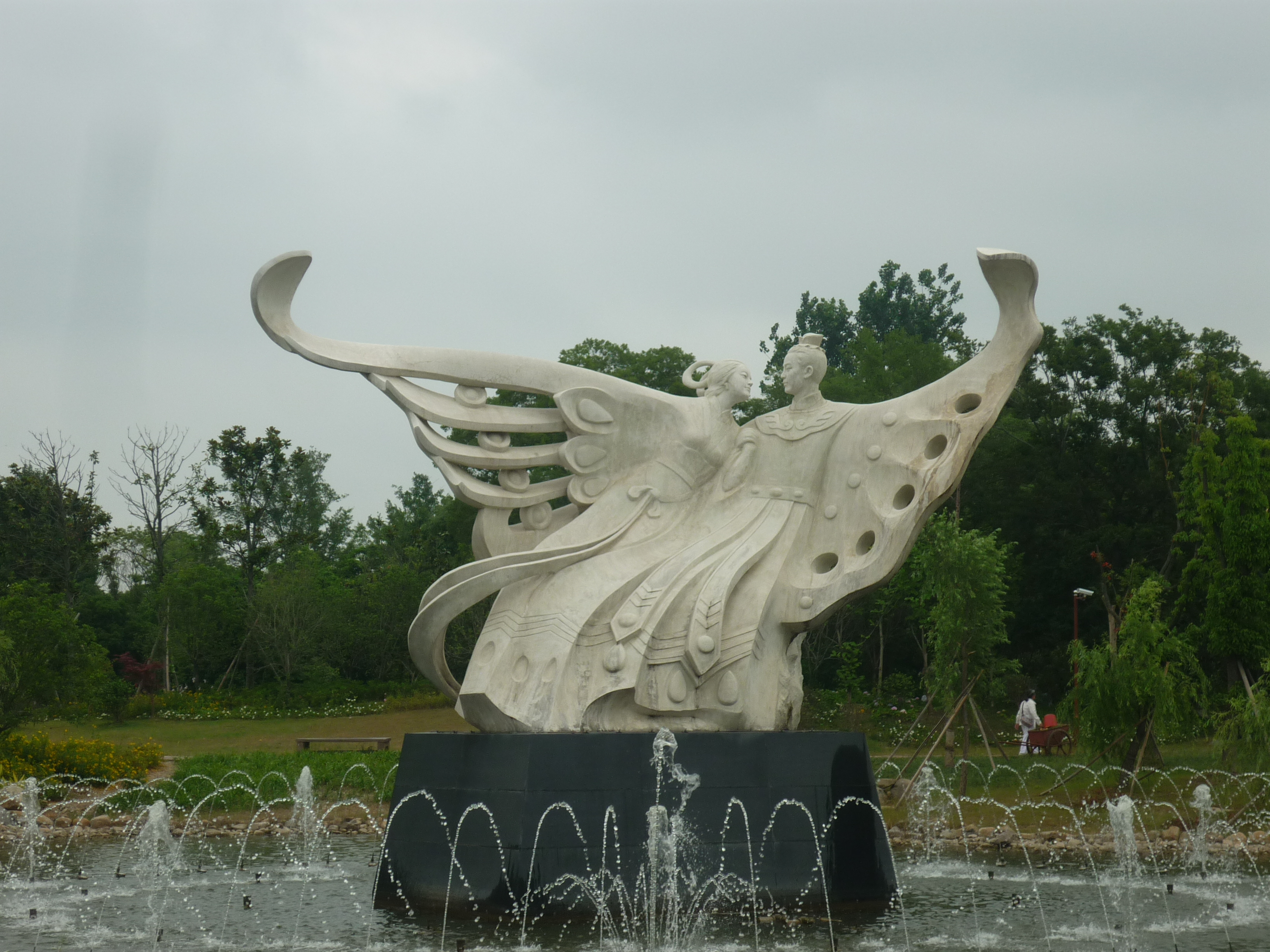
- 梁祝文化公园《梁祝化蝶》雕塑
- Interactive map of Liangzhu Culture Park
- Location: Liangzhu Village, Gaoqiao Town, Haishu District, Ningbo, Zhejiang Province, China
- Coordinates: 29°54′38″N 121°28′49″E
- Status: Operating
- Opened: 1999; 27 years ago
- Theme: Liang Shanbo and Zhu Yingtai
- Slogan: 江南千古情话，人间爱情殿堂
- Operating season: Annual
- Area: 20 hectares (49 acres)
- Website: Official website

The Liangzhu Culture Park (Chinese: 梁祝文化公园) is a theme park in Ningbo, Zhejiang Province, China.

== Background ==
Located in Liangzhu Village, Gaoqiao Town, Haishu District, the theme park was based on the legend of Liang Shanbo and Zhu Yingtai.

It was built on the site of the former Liang Shanbo Tomb and Liang Shanbo Temple and opened in 1999 as the first love-themed park in mainland China.

The theme park features multiple sceneries including Becoming Sworn Brothers at Thatched Bridge, Being Classmates for Three Years, 18 Miles of Send-off, Farewell in the Tower, and Reunion of Butterfly Lovers according to the main line of the story Liang Shanbo and Zhu Yingtai. The layout of ancient Chinese architectural style in the lower reaches of the Yangtze River such as kiosks, pavilions, platforms, and towers was adopted against the mountains and waters, realizing a gorgeous effect of diverse landscapes of mountain beyond mountain and garden beyond garden.

By the end of October 2010, the park was closed for renovation and expansion. It was reopened two years later in November 2012.

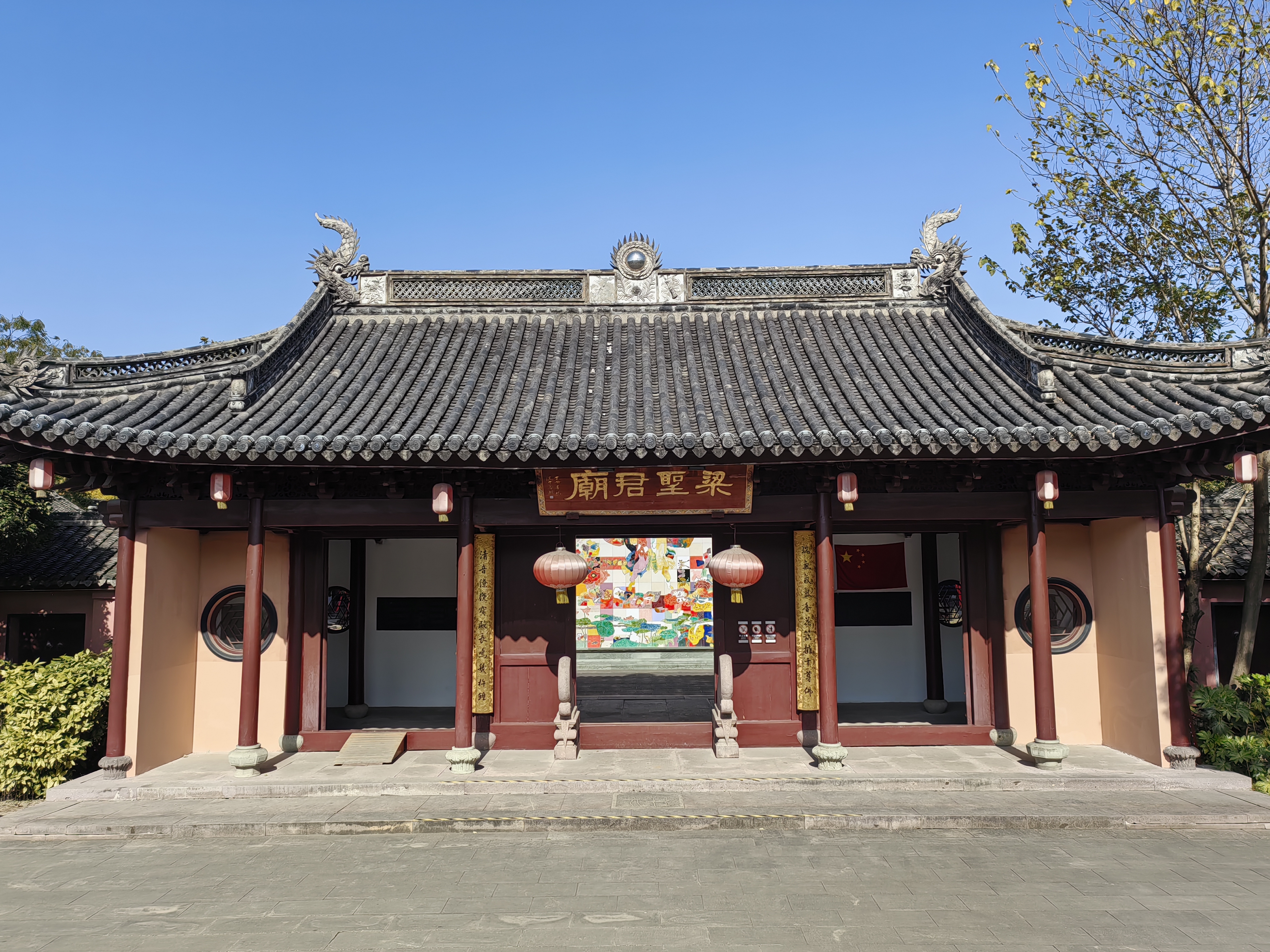
Liangshengjun Temple

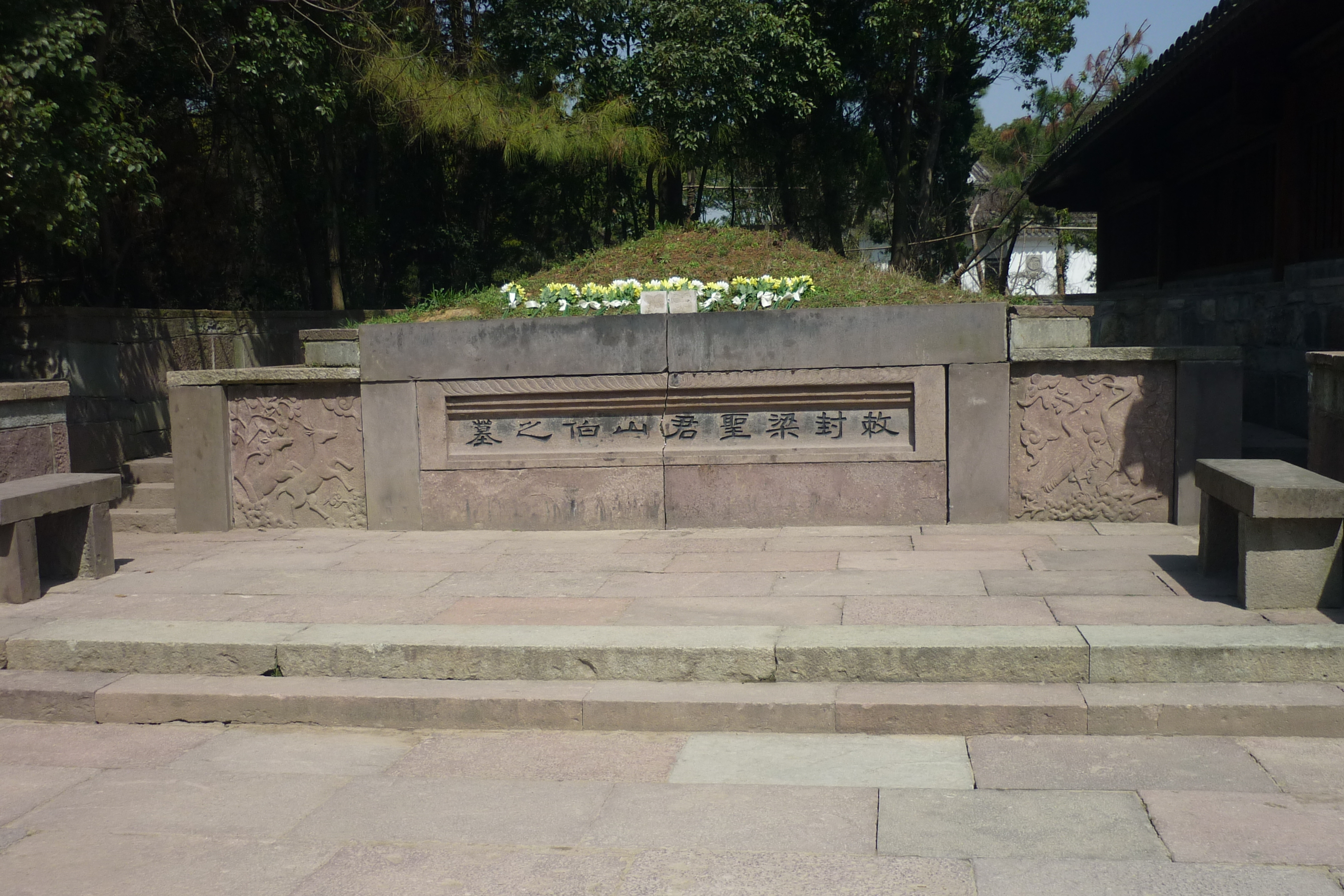
Liangzhu joint tomb, rebuilt in 1985

== See also ==
- Liangzhu station
