= Jianjie Ma =

- Occupations: Researcher, entrepreneur, and academic

Academic background
- Education: B.S., Physics; Ph.D., Physiology and Biophysics
- Alma mater: Wuhan University; Baylor College of Medicine

Jianjie Ma is researcher, entrepreneur and academic. He is the William H. Muller Professor and director of Surgical Sciences at the University of Virginia.

Ma's research encompasses muscle physiology, cardiovascular disease, regenerative medicine, immune modulation, cancer therapy, geriatric medicine, diabetes, and Alzheimer’s disease. In collaboration with Hiroshi Takeshima of, he has identified MG53, a muscle-specific tripartite motif protein essential for cell membrane repair as well as the TRiC family of counter-ion channels critical for excitation-contraction (E-C) coupling in muscle cells.

As of 2025, Ma's work has been cited 19,700 times according to Scopus.

== Education ==
Ma completed his B.S degree in Physics from Wuhan University in 1983. In 1989, he earned a Ph.D. in Physiology and Biophysics from Baylor College of Medicine and completed his postdoctoral studies from Rush University School of Medicine in 1991.

== Career ==
Ma began his academic career as assistant professor at the Rush University (1991 – 1992), followed by an appointment at Case Western Reserve University (CWRU) (1992 – 1996). In 1996, he was promoted to associate professor at CWRU and remained at the post until 2001. In 2001, he joined Robert Wood Johnson Medical School (RWJMS) at Rutgers University as a university-named professor and remained there until 2012. Between 2012 and 2022, he held the Karl P. Klassen Chair in Thoracic Surgery at Ohio State University (OSU), where he was also the vice chair of research in the Department of Surgery. In 2022, he joined the University of Virginia as the William H. Muller Endowed Professor.

Since 2022, Ma has been the director of the Division of Surgical Sciences at the University of Virginia. He has founded three biotechnology companies: TRIM-edicine, MGMedicine, and HTIC.

== Research ==
Ma has used different animal models, molecular and cellular imaging, gene editing, and delivery tools to investigate the physiologic function of novel genes in health and disease. Ma's early research has contributed to the identification of the ryanodine receptor as a functional calcium release channel and identified store-operated calcium entry (SOCE) in skeletal muscle excitable cells. His research also uncovered the function of SOCE in excitable muscle cells, highlighting its critical role in muscle function during exercise, fatigue, ageing, and muscular dystrophy.

Ma investigated the structure–function relationship of the cystic fibrosis transmembrane conductance regulator (CFTR) as a chloride channel. He identified a critical region within the regulatory (R) domain that modulates channel activity, and demonstrated that certain CFTR processing mutants retain functional chloride channel activity when reconstituted into lipid bilayer membranes.

Alongside colleagues, Ma also explored mechanisms of mitochondrial apoptosis, highlighting that calcium flux and pro-apoptotic proteins contribute to mitochondrial-mediated cell death.

In collaboration with Hiroshi Takeshima, Ma's research focused on defining the molecular framework of E-C coupling and its relevance to human disease and regenerative medicine. The collaboration resulted in the description of TRIC channels as essential for intracellular calcium handling. Their work also identified MG29, a synaptophysin-family protein involved in transverse-tubule biogenesis and calcium signaling. This collaboration also resulted in the discovery of MG53, a key component of the cell membrane repair machinery. Subsequent studies demonstrated that MG53 possesses potent anti-inflammatory and tissue-protective properties across a range of disease models.

Ma’s research on Alzheimer's disease focused on the neuroprotective and anti-inflammatory properties of MG53, and were undertaken to develop strategies for the prevention of cognitive decline associated with neuroinflammation. He has also contributed to the development of an exercise pill aimed at treating diabetes.

As of 2025, Ma's work has been cited 19,700 times according to Scopus.

== Awards and honors ==
- 1983 – Fellowship, China US Physics Examination Application (CUSPEA)
- 1994 – Established Investigator, American Heart Association
- 1999 – Research Fellow, Japan Society for the Promotion of Sciences
- 2025 – Dean's Excellence of Research Award, University of Virginia

== Selected articles ==
- Ma, Jianjie; Fill, Michael; Knudson, C. Michael; Campbell, Kevin P.; Coronado, Roberto (October 7, 1988). "Ryanodine Receptor of Skeletal Muscle Is a Gap Junction-Type Channel". Science. 242 (4875): 99–102. doi:10.1126/science.2459777. 242
- Pan, Zui; Yang, Dongmei; Nagaraj, Ramakrishnan Y.; Nosek, Thomas A.; Nishi, Miyuki; Takeshima, Hiroshi; Cheng, Heping; Ma, Jianjie (May 2002). "Dysfunction of store-operated calcium channel in muscle cells lacking mg29". Nature Cell Biology. 4 (5): 379–383. doi:10.1038/ncb788. 196
- Wang, Xu; Weisleder, Noah; Collet, Claude; Zhou, Jingsong; Chu, Yi; Hirata, Yutaka; Zhao, Xiaoli; Pan, Zui; Brotto, Marco; Cheng, Heping; Ma, Jianjie (May 2005). "Uncontrolled calcium sparks act as a dystrophic signal for mammalian skeletal muscle". Nature Cell Biology. 7 (5): 525–530. doi:10.1038/ncb1254. 185
- Yazawa, Masayuki; Ferrante, Christopher; Feng, Jue; Mio, Kazuhiro; Ogura, Toshihiko; Zhang, Miao; Lin, Pei-Hui; Pan, Zui; Komazaki, Shinji; Kato, Kazuhiro; Nishi, Miyuki; Zhao, Xiaoli; Weisleder, Noah; Sato, Chikara; Ma, Jianjie; Takeshima, Hiroshi (July 2007). "TRIC channels are essential for Ca2+ handling in intracellular stores". Nature. 448 (7149): 78–82. doi:10.1038/nature05928. 205
- Cai, Chuanxi; Masumiya, Haruko; Weisleder, Noah; Matsuda, Noriyuki; Nishi, Miyuki; Hwang, Moonsun; Ko, Jae-Kyun; Lin, Peihui; Thornton, Angela; Zhao, Xiaoli; Pan, Zui; Komazaki, Shinji; Brotto, Marco; Takeshima, Hiroshi; Ma, Jianjie (January 2009). "MG53 nucleates assembly of cell membrane repair machinery". Nature Cell Biology. 11 (1): 56–64. doi:10.1038/ncb1812. 531
