= Tianyi Square =

Square in Ningbo, China

Coordinates: 29.8720°N 121.5500°E

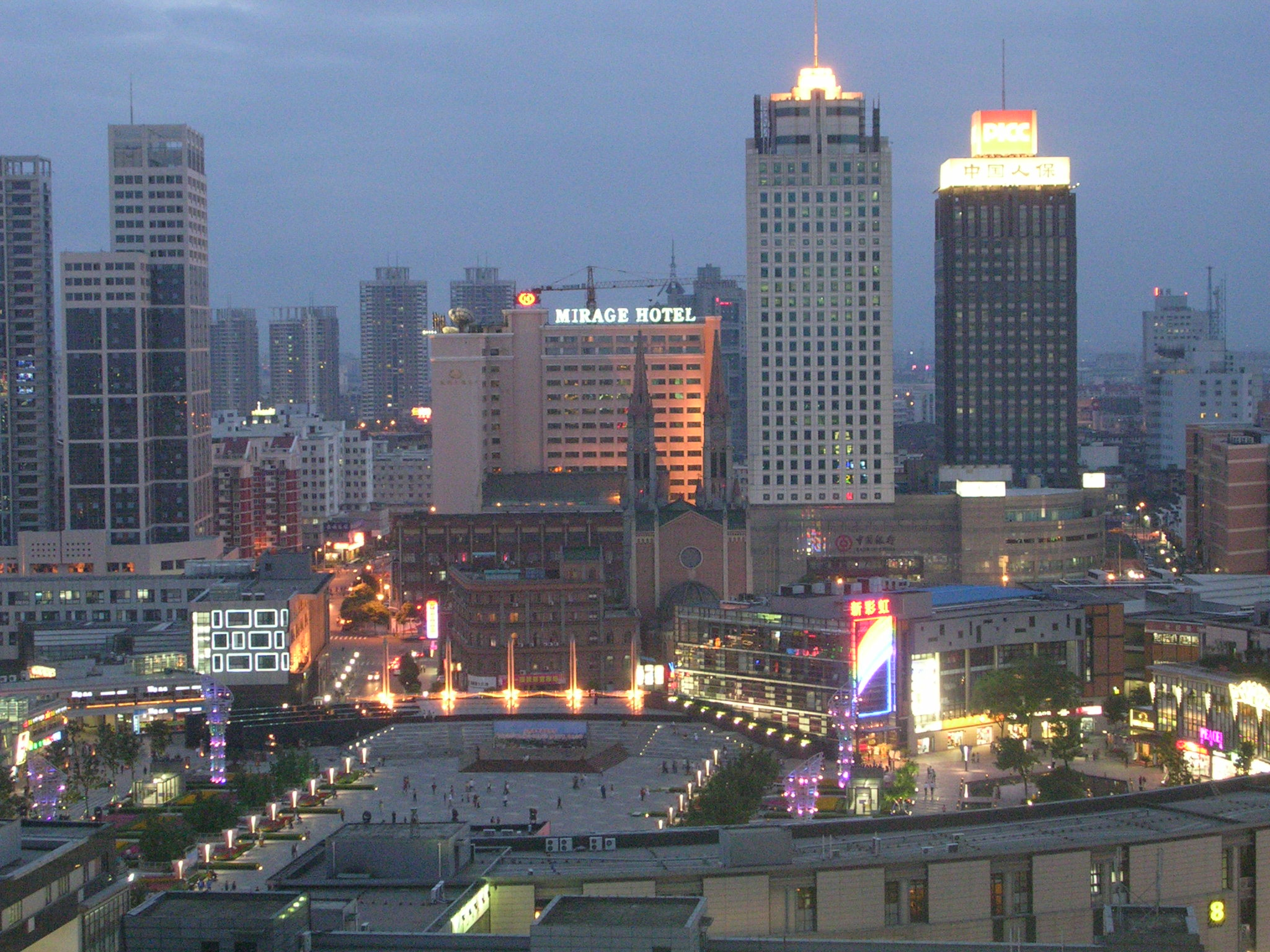
Tianyi Square

Tianyi Square (Chinese: 天一广场) was the biggest square in Ningbo, Zhejiang province, China designed by architect Qingyun Ma.

== Location ==
It is located in the Ningbo city centre, Zhongshan Road, Haishu District, covering an area of 200,000 square metres (49 acres).

== History ==
It was completed in 2002. The Square is surrounded by 22 different buildings with a European style. In the central part, there is an open area covering 350,000 square metres (86 acres) and a water area covering 6,000 square metres (65,000 square feet) which includes pools and fountain. There is a musical fountain in the central square, which is the highest one in Asia with a height of 40 metres (130 feet). The fountain can turn into different shapes and styles, such as mineral-flower-style and waltz-flower-style. Near the fountain, there is a water screen where tourists can watch movies. The water screen is 20 metres (66 feet) high and 60 metres (200 feet) wide. There is also a typical Gothic Church in front of the square.

Tianyi Square is also the biggest multi-function square in China. It won the prize for the best public art construction after being completed in 2003.

== Sections ==
The Square is divided into 10 sections, including supermarket area, retail area, electronics area, souvenir area, clothing area, hotel area, entertainment area, restaurant area, children’s area and a mixed area. There are a total of about 300 shops in the Square. Tian Yi Square provides tourists and citizens with a fashionable and pleasant paradise for relaxing and shopping. It is also a lively and important commercial area for business and trade in Ningbo.
