= Tashan Weir =

Ancient dam in Ningbo, China

- 它山堰
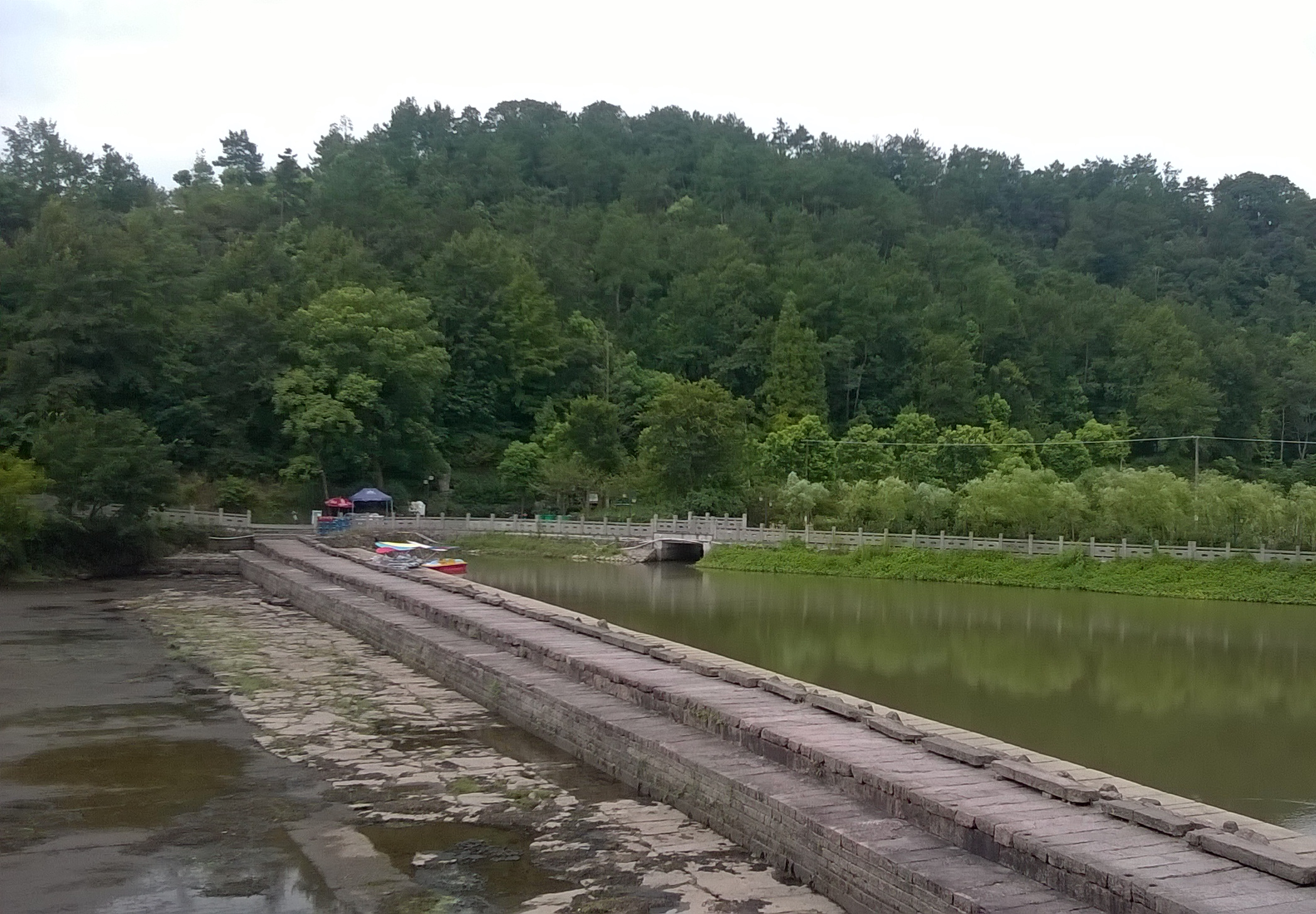
- Interactive map of Tashan Weir
- Location: Tashanyan Village, Yinjiang Town, Haishu District, Ningbo, Zhejiang, China
- Coordinates: 29.769607°N 121.347248°E
- Designer: Wang Yuanwei
- Type: Dam
- Length: 110 metres (360 ft)
- Completion date: 833

Tashan Weir (Chinese: 它山堰; pinyin: Tuōshān yàn) also called Tuoshan Weir or Tuoshanyan is an ancient dam that was erected under Emperor Tang Wenzong during the Tang dynasty in 833. The dam is located in Tashanyan Village, Yinjiang Town, Haishu District, Ningbo, Zhejiang, China. Originally designed under the supervision of Wang Yuanwei, then magistrate of Yin County, the dam was constructed to prevent tidal sea water from accessing the banks of the Fenghua River and to store water during periods of severe drought. The dam later became part of a large-scale irrigation system serving Ningbo City. This infrastructure is particularly notable because it is recognized as a historical site protected by the state.

== History ==
Prior to the dam's construction, the surrounding area experienced devastating floods from torrential rains every summer and autumn due to the sub-tropical climate. In addition, salty water from Fenghua river, which is a tidal river and connected with Yinjiang river through all the tributaries of the latter, would reach farthest to 3 kilometers upstream of Yinjiang Town, and caused the freshwater resources of the upper Yinjiang river largely unusable for irrigation and other purposes. To address these recurring challenges, Wang Yuanwei, the magistrate of Yin County, spearheaded the construction of the Tashan Weir on the Yinjiang River. Completed in 833 A.D. during the Tang Dynasty, this innovative hydraulic project was designed to permanently mitigate the harmful effects of tidal saltwater intrusion on farmland and to reduce the risks posed by flooding.

Tashan weir divided the Yinjiang river into two: fresh water is stored in the Tang rivers, irrigating 240,000 mu of farmland in seven townships of the area, while the salty tide is blocked. When floods occur upstream, the weir can overflow and, combined with the other hydraulic projects downstream, achieve the purpose of flood diversion. It has been calculated that for a 20-year flood, the Tashan weir, in combination with the downstream hydraulic projects, can divert about 70% of the flood.

Ancient network of the different Ningbo water courses, with Sun and Moon lakes highlighted

After the 1970s, two large reservoirs were built on the upstream tributaries of the Yinjiang river, and the importance of Tashan weir was greatly reduced, but it still performs irrigation and flood control functions.

== Construction ==
The dam is about 110 metres long and its crest is about 5 metres wide. Its body is made up of stacked stones (each about 2 to 3 metres long and 0.2 to 0.35 metres thick). To strengthen the structure, molten iron was directly injected into some sections. From the imperial dynasties to the present day, the dam has been continuously maintained and restructured.

The Tashan Weir features a distinctive structural design to ensure stability and longevity. The weir body exhibits a maximum thickness of 4 meters at its center, gradually tapering towards the sides, where the thickness typically ranges from 2.3 to 2.8 meters. This "thick middle, thin sides" configuration enhances the structural integrity of the central portion, which is subject to greater subsidence due to the underlying riverbed deposits. The southern end of the weir, founded directly on bedrock, has a reduced thickness of 1.8 to 2.0 meters. Furthermore, the weir's base is inclined upstream at an approximate angle of 5 degrees, significantly enhancing its resistance to slippage and ensuring long-term stability.

== Legacy ==
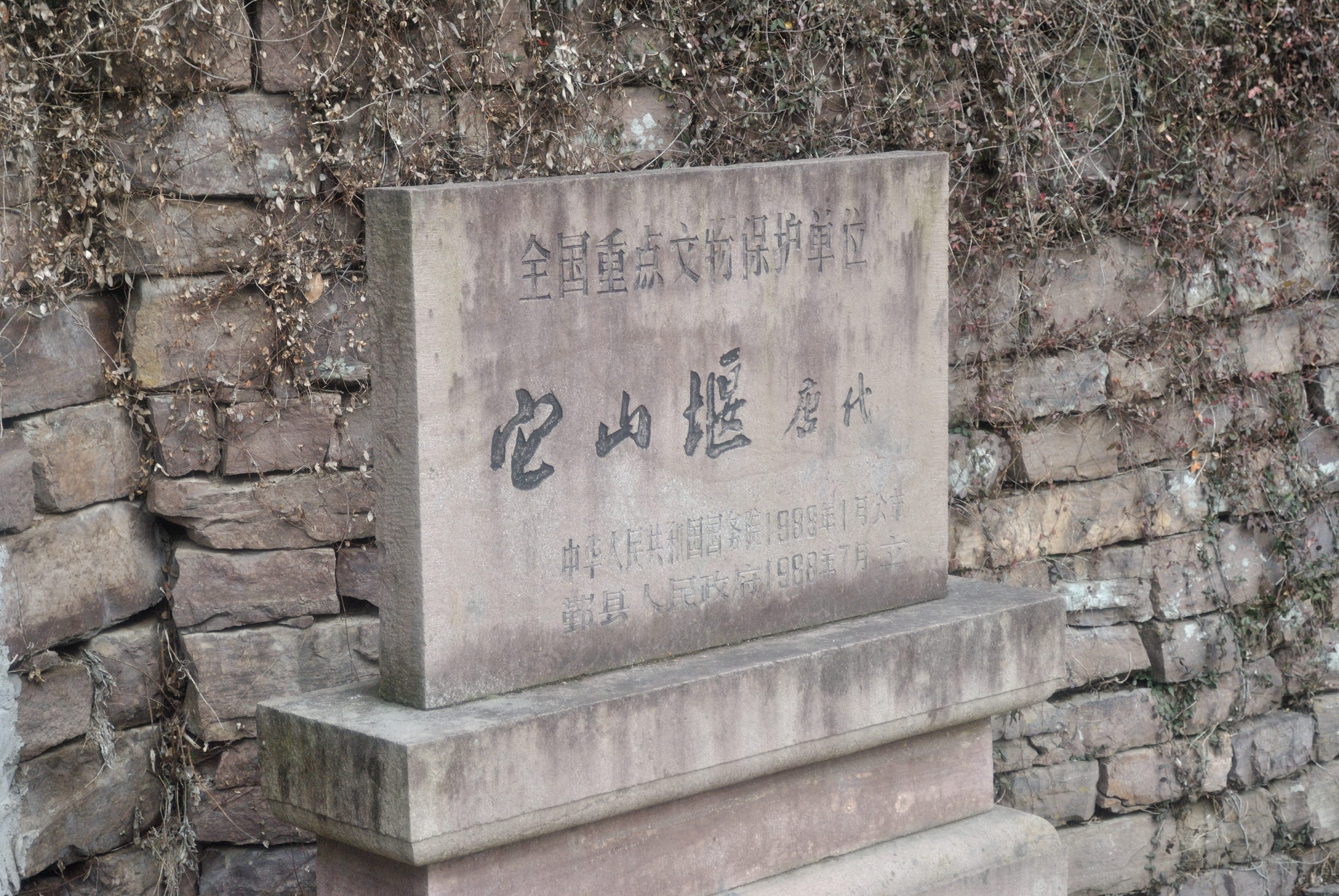
Stela commemorating the accession of Tashan Weir as a Major Historical and Cultural Site Protected at the National Level

Tashan Weir was officially declared a Major Historical and Cultural Site Protected at the National Level on January 13, 1988 (Number 3-55). It is also recognized as one of the four most important water conservation projects of imperial or pre-imperial China, along with the Zhengguo Canal, Lingqu Canal, and Dujiangyan. A temple with a statue representing Wang Yuanwei and ten builders of Tashan Weir was built nearby, and important ceremonies and cultural festivities are regularly held there.

== Gallery ==
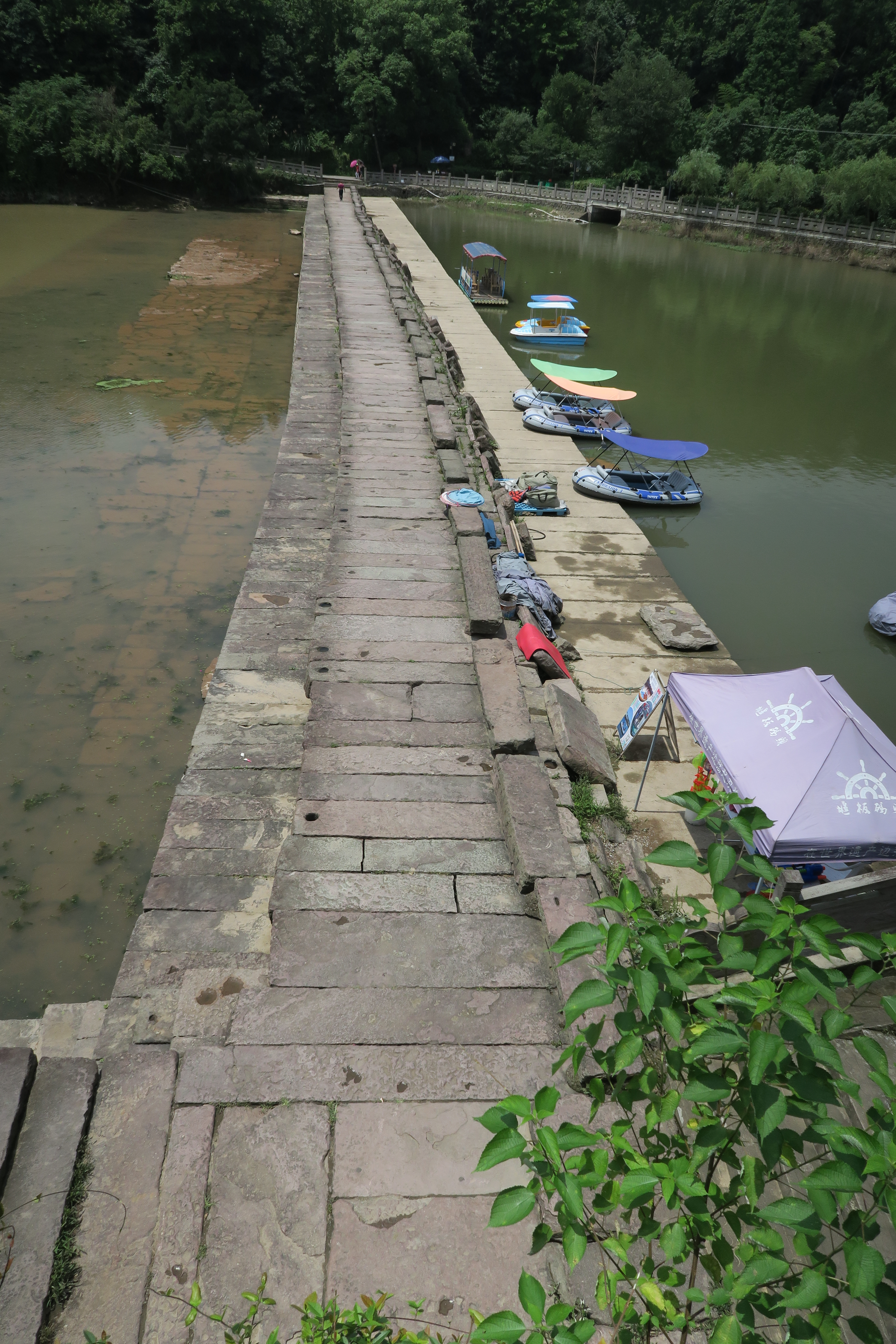
View from the northern bank of the river

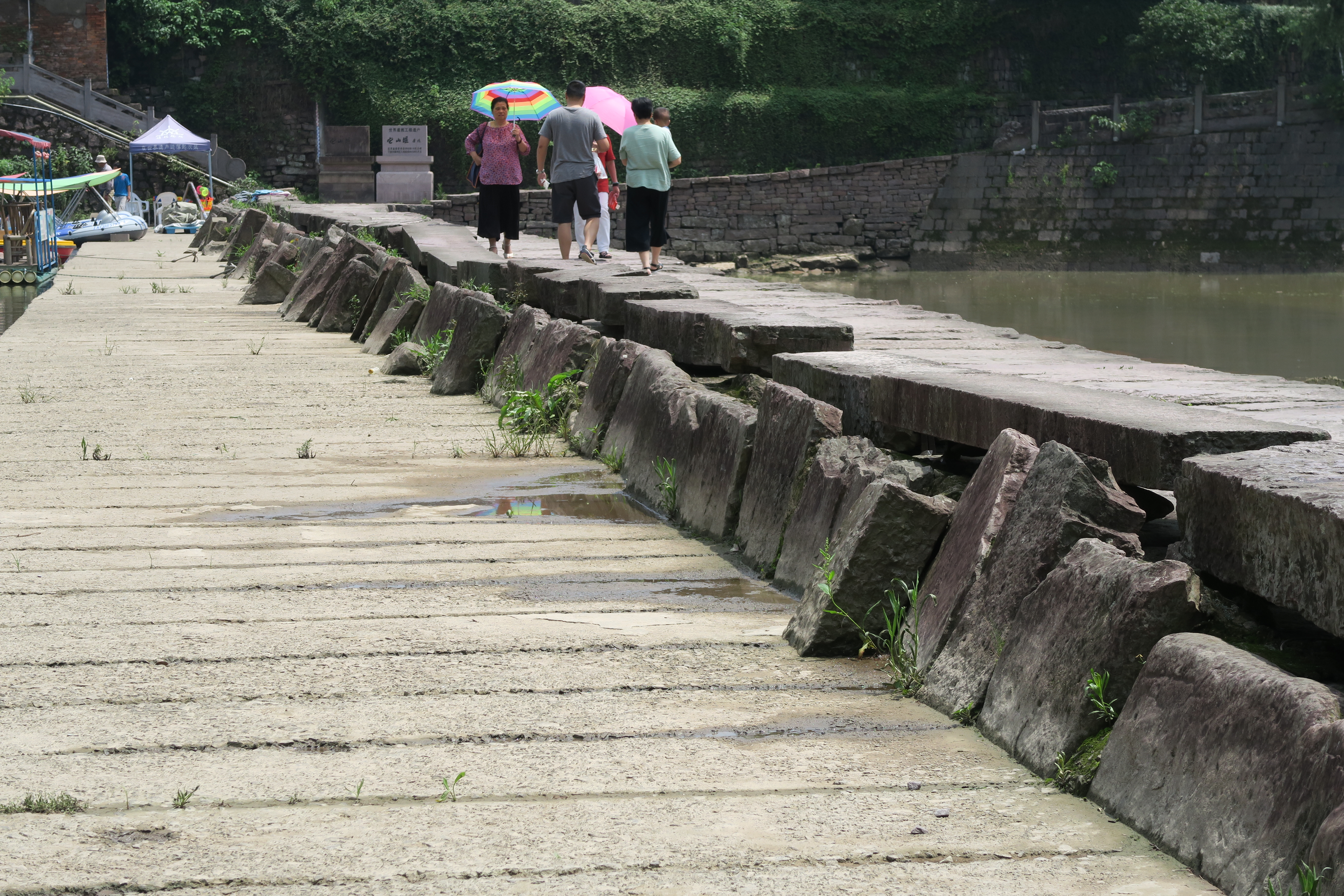
First edge of the dam

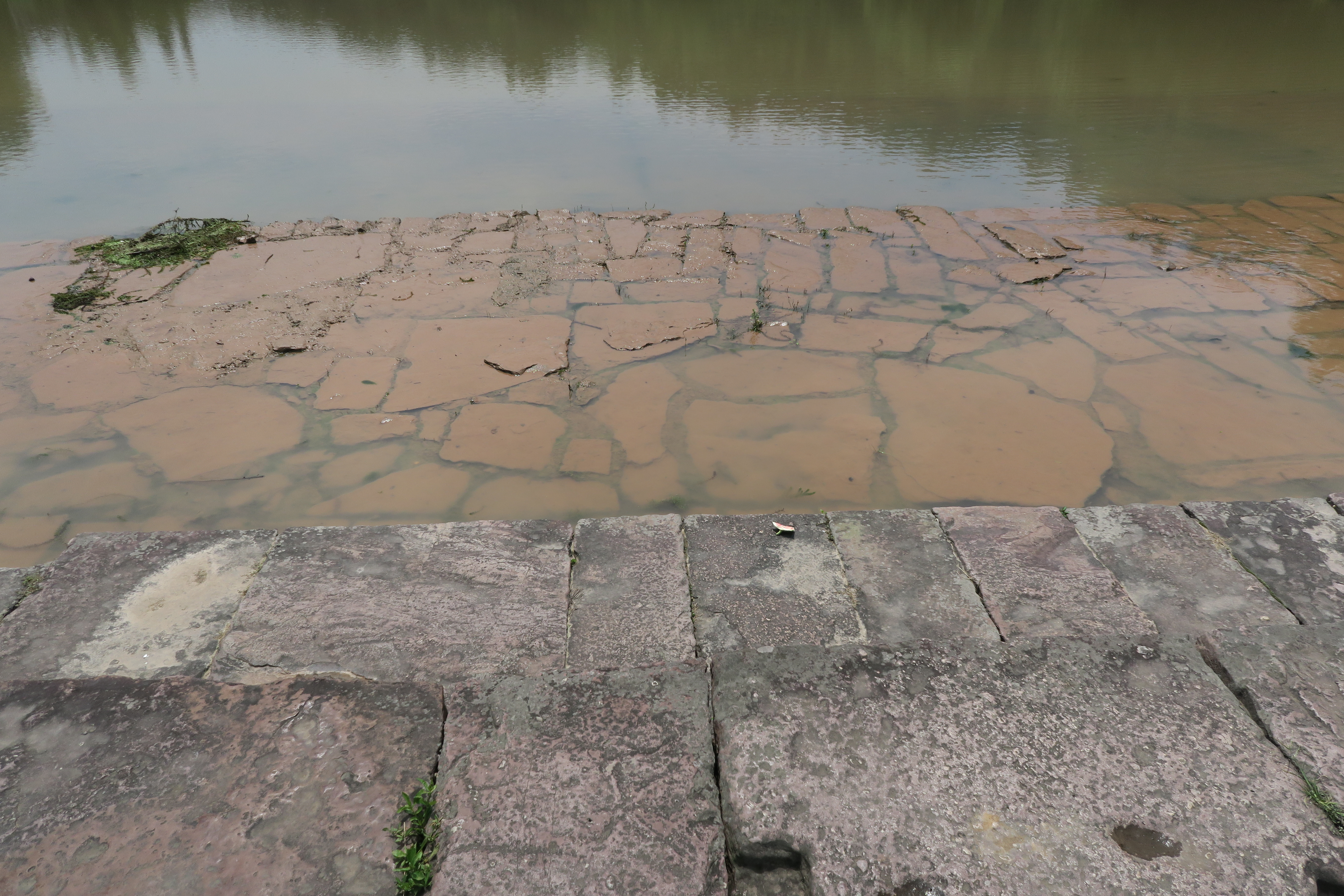
Second edge of the dam

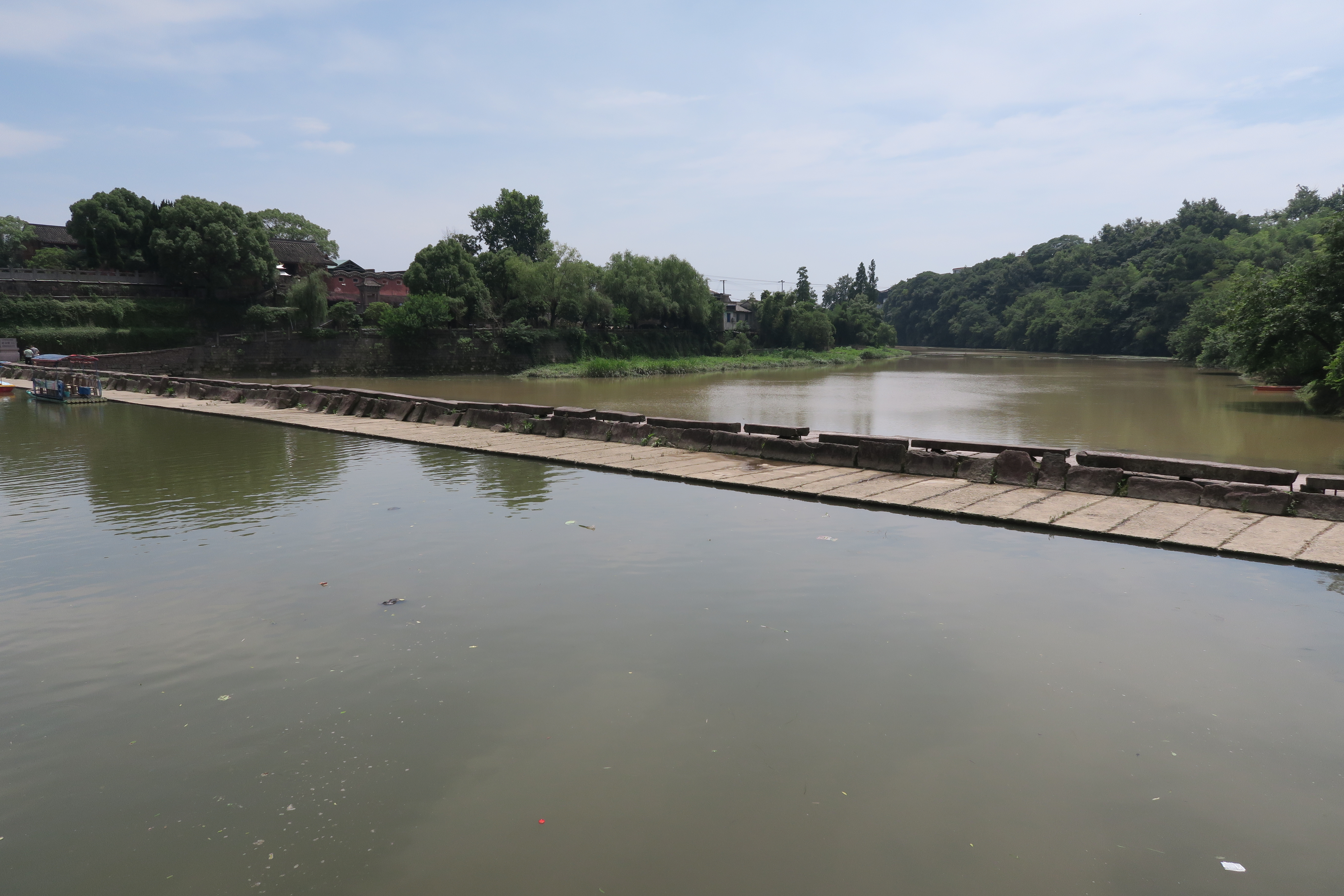
View from the west

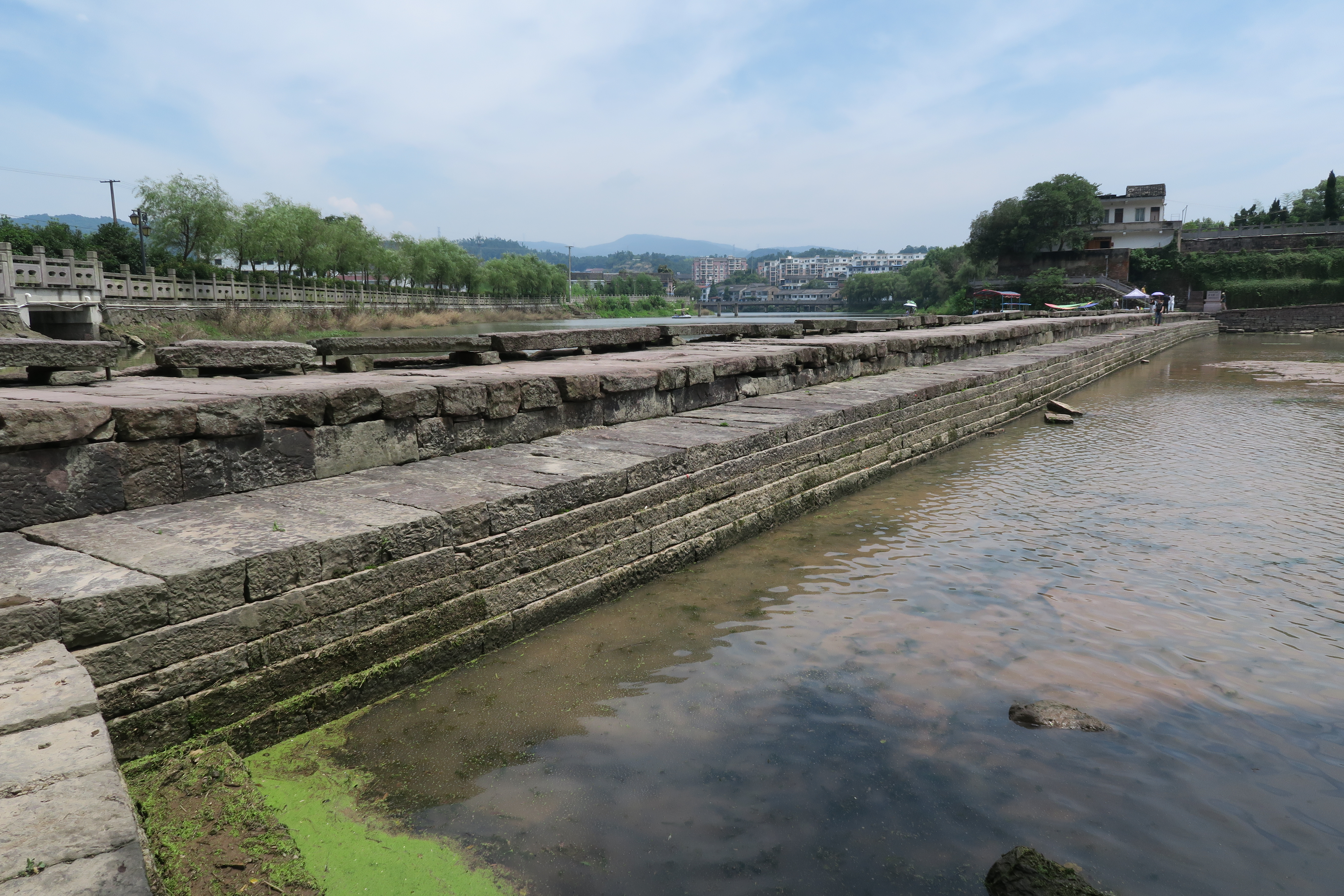
View from the east

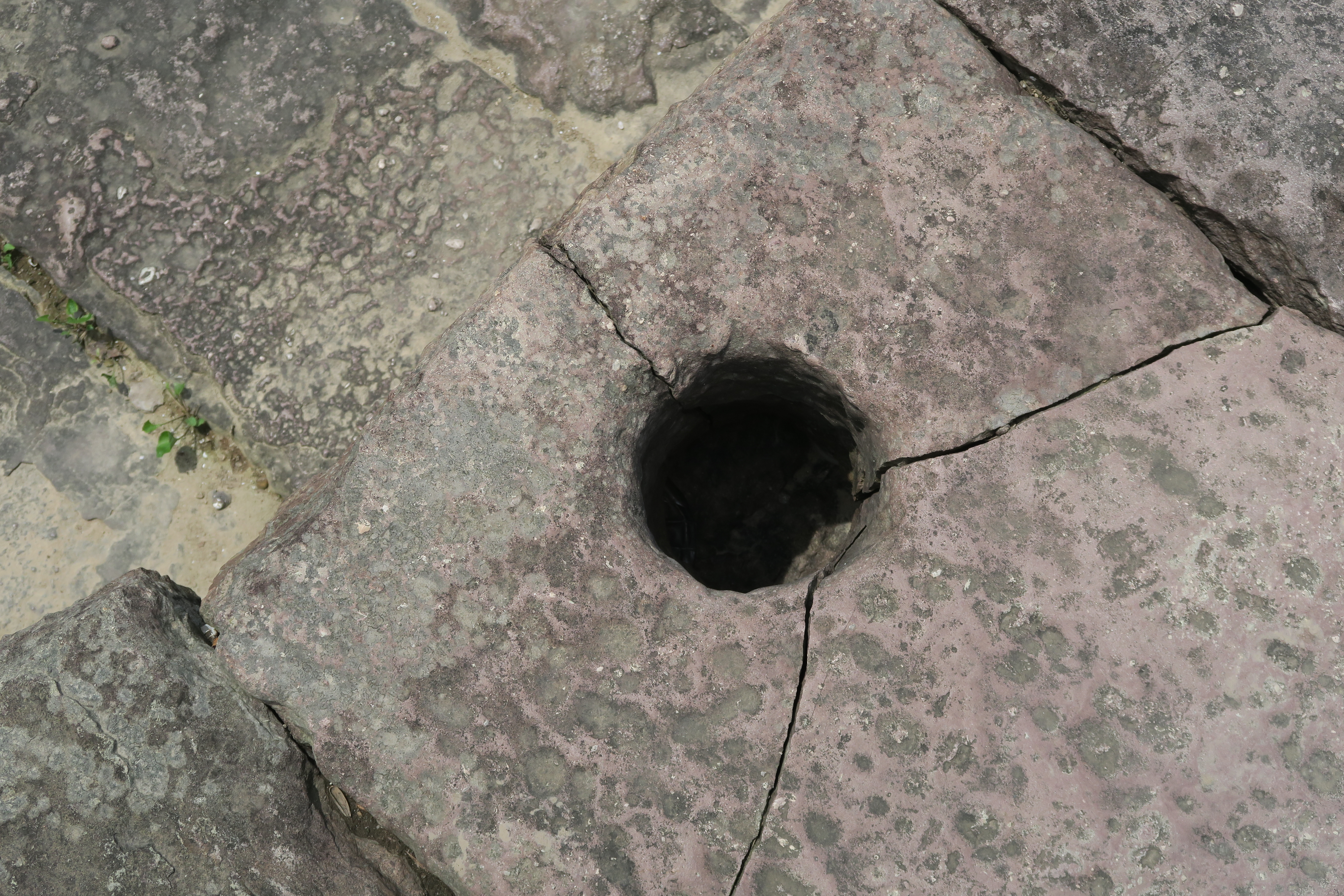
Holes where molten iron was introduced

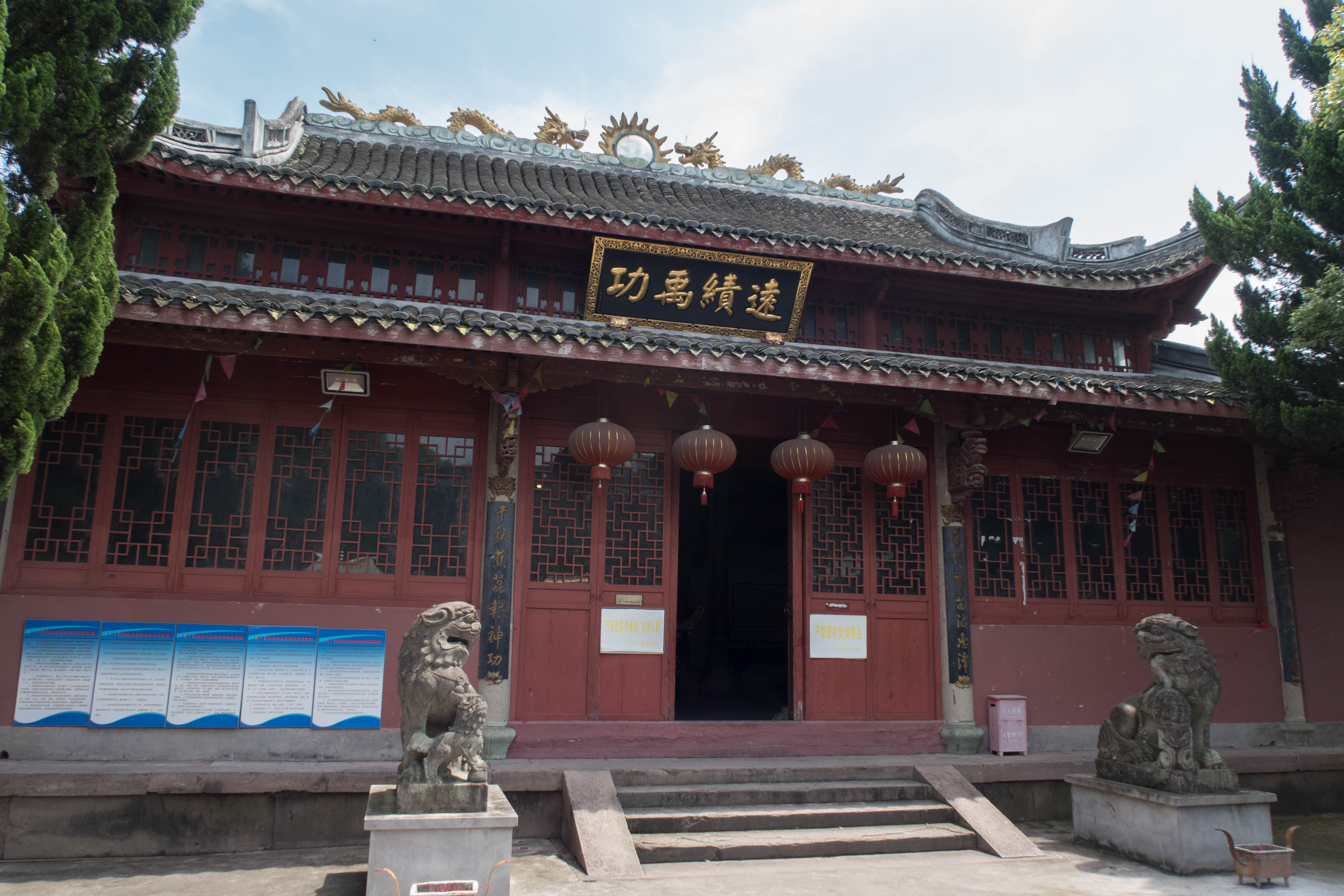
Main Hall of the Memorial Temple of the building of Tashan Weir

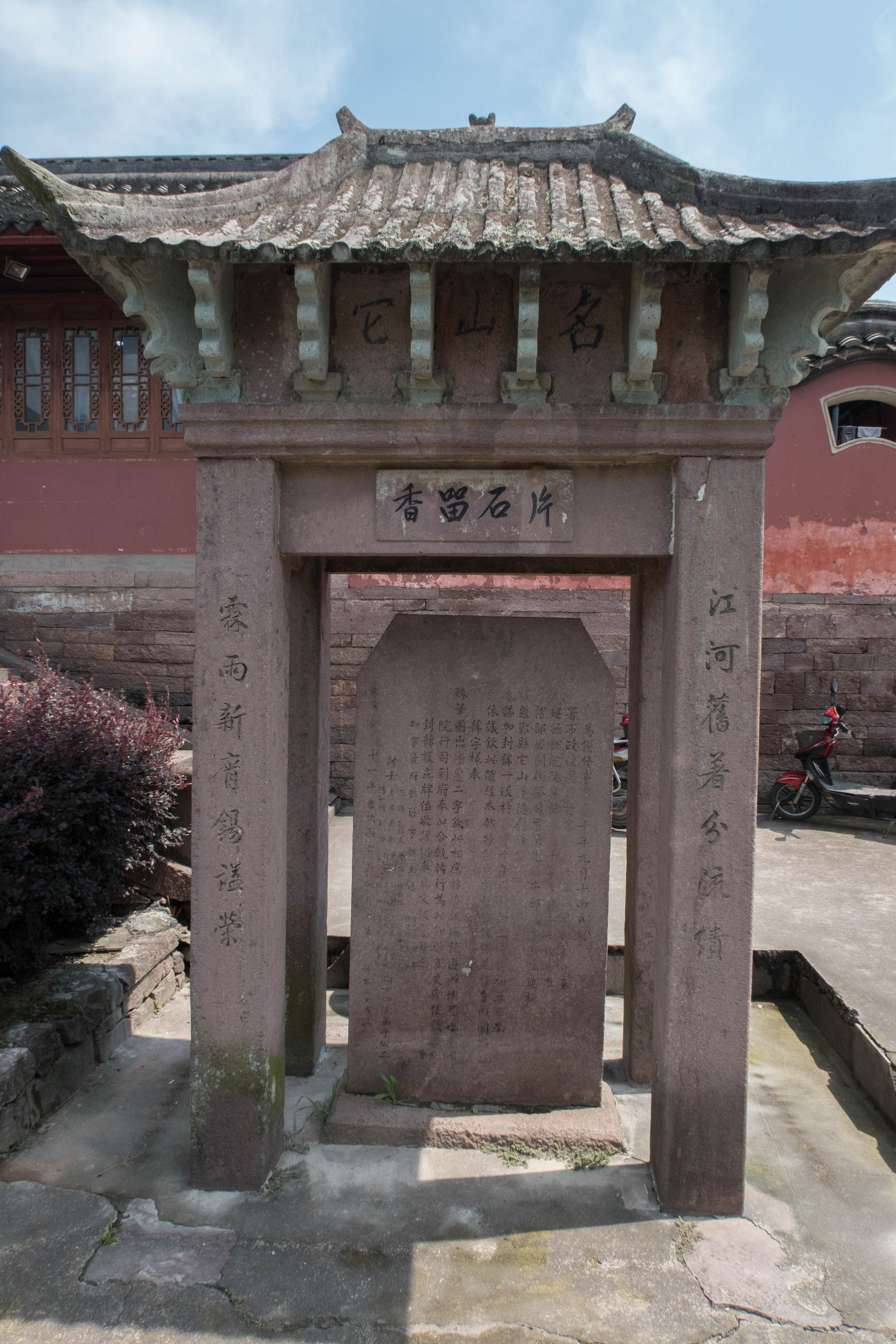
Stele marking the emplacement of the temple

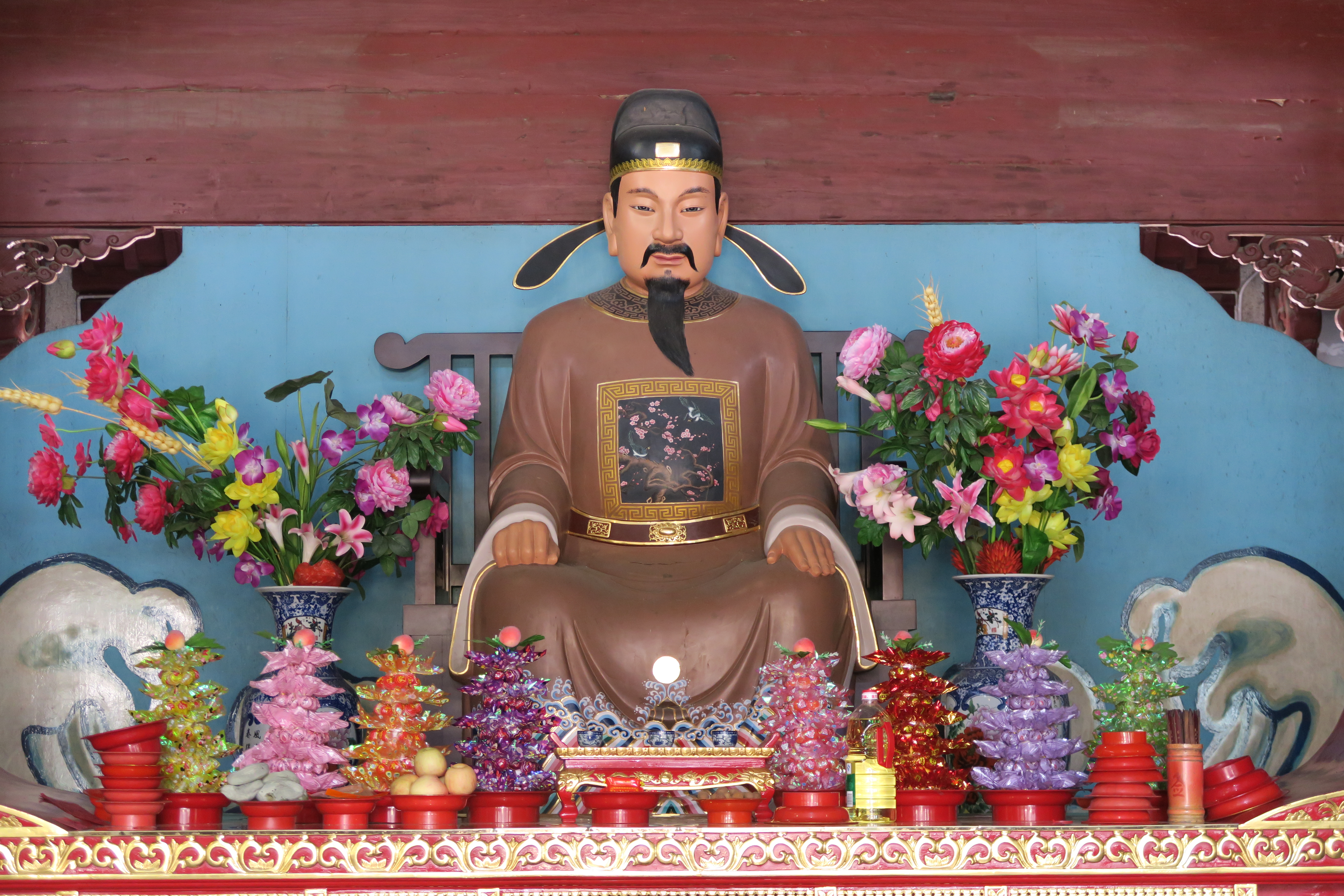
Statue of Wang Yuanwei

== See also ==
- Lingqu Canal
- Zhengguo Canal
- Dujiangyan
