= TMEM38B =

Identifiers
- Aliases: TMEM38B, C9orf87, D4Ertd89e, OI14, TRIC-B, TRICB, bA219P18.1, transmembrane protein 38B
- External IDs: OMIM: 611236; MGI: 1098718; HomoloGene: 10010; GeneCards: TMEM38B; OMA:TMEM38B - orthologs

Gene location (Mouse)
Chr.	Chromosome 4 (mouse)
Band	4 B2|4 28.76 cM	Start	53,826,045 bp
Band	4 B2|4 28.76 cM	End	53,862,019 bp
RNA expression pattern
Bgee	Human / Mouse (ortholog); Top expressed in: sperm; biceps brachii; right ventricle; tibialis anterior muscle; gastrocnemius muscle; vastus lateralis muscle; deltoid muscle; islet of Langerhans; corpus epididymis; Achilles tendon / Top expressed in: gastrula; parotid gland; temporal muscle; triceps brachii muscle; sternocleidomastoid muscle; thoracic diaphragm; submandibular gland; granulocyte; digastric muscle; knee joint; More reference expression data
BioGPS	n/a
Gene ontology
Molecular function	potassium channel activity; cation channel activity; calcium-activated potassium channel activity
Cellular component	membrane; integral component of membrane; nuclear membrane; endoplasmic reticulum membrane; endoplasmic reticulum; sarcoplasmic reticulum membrane; nucleus
Biological process	potassium ion transport; ion transport; potassium ion transmembrane transport; transport; ossification; endoplasmic reticulum organization; phospholipid biosynthetic process; regulation of cardiac muscle contraction by regulation of the release of sequestered calcium ion; release of sequestered calcium ion into cytosol by sarcoplasmic reticulum; bone mineralization; lung alveolus development; release of sequestered calcium ion into cytosol; bone development; lung epithelial cell differentiation; secretion by lung epithelial cell involved in lung growth; extracellular matrix constituent secretion; cellular response to caffeine; release of sequestered calcium ion into cytosol by endoplasmic reticulum; cation transmembrane transport; ion transmembrane transport
Sources:Amigo / QuickGO
Orthologs
Species	Human	Mouse
Entrez	55151	52076
Ensembl	n/a	ENSMUSG00000028420
UniProt	Q9NVV0	Q9DAV9
RefSeq (mRNA)	NM_018112	NM_028053
RefSeq (protein)	NP_060582	NP_082329
Location (UCSC)	n/a	Chr 4: 53.83 – 53.86 Mb
PubMed search
- Wikidata
View/Edit Human	View/Edit Mouse

Trimeric intracellular cation-selective channel B (TRIC-B) is a monovalent cation channel in the ER membrane encoded by the transmembrane protein 38B (TMEM38B) gene. It is one of two known TRIC proteins, the other being TRIC-A.

== Function ==
TRIC-B is permeable to both Na^{+} and K^{+} but not divalent cations like Ca^{2+}. The channel exhibits marked voltage-dependence, becoming more open when the cytosol is more positively charged than the ER lumen. There at least four major sub-conductance states (with 80%, 60%, 46% and 30% of the conductance of the fully-opened channel). TMEM38B-knockout mice exhibit reduced IP_{3}-receptor-mediated Ca^{2+} release. As such, K^{+} flux into the ER through TRIC-B is thought to support IP_{3}-induced efflux of Ca^{2+} ions through IP_{3}-gated Ca^{2+} channels in the ER membrane.

== Clinical significance ==
Null mutations in TMEM38B reduce the levels of functional TRIC-B in heterozygotes and abolish expression of functional TRIC-B in homozygotes. Such mutations are an uncommon but relatively severe cause of autosomal recessive osteogenesis imperfecta or "brittle bone disease".

== See also ==
- TMEM38A
- Trimeric intracellular cation-selective channel
