= TMEM38A =

Monovalent cation channel

Identifiers
- Aliases: TMEM38A, TRIC-A, TRICA, transmembrane protein 38A
- External IDs: OMIM: 611235; MGI: 1921416; HomoloGene: 11449; GeneCards: TMEM38A; OMA:TMEM38A - orthologs

Gene location (Human)
Chr.	Chromosome 19 (human)
Band	19p13.11	Start	16,661,139 bp
Band	19p13.11	End	16,690,023 bp

Gene location (Mouse)
Chr.	Chromosome 8 (mouse)
Band	8|8 B3.3	Start	72,572,055 bp
Band	8|8 B3.3	End	72,587,282 bp
RNA expression pattern
Bgee	Human / Mouse (ortholog); Top expressed in: muscle of thigh; gastrocnemius muscle; quadriceps femoris muscle; vastus lateralis muscle; skeletal muscle tissue; tibialis anterior muscle; Skeletal muscle tissue of rectus abdominis; deltoid muscle; biceps brachii; Skeletal muscle tissue of biceps brachii / Top expressed in: interventricular septum; muscle of thigh; skeletal muscle tissue; medial head of gastrocnemius muscle; triceps brachii muscle; quadriceps femoris muscle; tibialis anterior muscle; temporal muscle; sternocleidomastoid muscle; vastus lateralis muscle; More reference expression data
BioGPS	n/a
Gene ontology
Molecular function	potassium channel activity; cation channel activity; calcium-activated potassium channel activity
Cellular component	sarcoplasmic reticulum; integral component of membrane; nuclear membrane; extracellular exosome; membrane; sarcoplasmic reticulum membrane; nucleus
Biological process	potassium ion transport; ion transport; potassium ion transmembrane transport; transport; endoplasmic reticulum organization; regulation of cardiac muscle contraction by regulation of the release of sequestered calcium ion; release of sequestered calcium ion into cytosol by sarcoplasmic reticulum; protein homotrimerization; cellular response to caffeine
Sources:Amigo / QuickGO
Orthologs
Species	Human	Mouse
Entrez	79041	74166
Ensembl	ENSG00000072954	ENSMUSG00000031791
UniProt	Q9H6F2	Q3TMP8
RefSeq (mRNA)	NM_024074	NM_144534
RefSeq (protein)	NP_076979	NP_653117; NP_001344207; NP_001344208; NP_001344209; NP_001344213
Location (UCSC)	Chr 19: 16.66 – 16.69 Mb	Chr 8: 72.57 – 72.59 Mb
PubMed search
- Wikidata
View/Edit Human	View/Edit Mouse

Trimeric intracellular cation-selective channel A (TRIC-A) is a monovalent cation channel in the SR and nuclear membranes of skeletal muscle cells, encoded by the transmembrane protein 38A (TMEM38A) gene. It is one of two known TRIC proteins, the other being TRIC-B.

== Structure ==
TRIC-A is a 33kDa transmembrane protein, expressed predominantly in excitable tissues including skeletal muscle and brain. Its N-terminal region is located in the SR lumen or within the nucleus while its C-terminal region projects into the cytoplasm. In situ, TRIC-A forms homo-trimers, producing its "bullet-shaped" three-dimensional structure (see Venturi et al. (2012), Figure 1 for a three-dimensional rendering of TRIC-A).

== Function ==
TRIC-A is permeable to both Na^{+} and K^{+} but not divalent cations like Ca^{2+}. The channel exhibits marked voltage-dependence, becoming more open when the cytosol is more positively charged than the ER lumen. TMEM38A-knockout mice exhibit reduced Ryanodine receptor 1-mediated Ca^{2+} release; as such, K^{+} flux into the SR through TRIC-A is thought to support RyR1-mediated efflux of Ca^{2+} ions from the sarcoplasmic reticulum into the cytosol. These knockouts also develop hypertension during early adulthood, whereas transgenic mice overexpressing TRIC-A develop hypotension. These results are thought to reflect a role for TRIC-A in the excitability of vascular smooth muscle cells.

== Clinical significance ==
TRIC-A has been implicated in the regulation of arterial blood pressure through regulating the excitability of vascular smooth muscle cells. Several single-nucleotide polymorphisms (SNPs) in close proximity to the TRIC-A locus increase the risk of hypertension and reduce the efficiency of antihypertensive drugs in its treatment. Such SNPs are in positive linkage disequilibrium with TRIC-A, meaning they are unlikely to be separated by genetic recombination and so are more frequently inherited together from the same parent chromosome. As such, TRIC-A SNPs can provide biomarkers for the diagnosis of essential hypertension and, in future, may help to determine which treatments may be most well-suited to a given individual (see personalized medicine).

== See also ==
- TMEM38B
- Trimeric intracellular cation-selective channel
