= Henry C. Ma =

- 馬基

Chief Commissioner of the Scout Association of Hong Kong

Henry C. Ma (Chinese: 馬基; Jyutping: Maa^{5} Gei^{1}) served as the Chief Commissioner of the Scout Association of Hong Kong.

Ma was active in Scouting both before and after World War II. Ma used market research and project management to gather feedback, build consensus, disseminate objectives and drive initiatives. He authorized a management survey conducted by J. Plaridel Silvestre, Regional Commissioner of the Asia Pacific office of the World Scout Bureau in 1975, which resulted in reforms of the Scout organization. Ma was particularly fond of project management was only emerging in the late 1960s. A list in 1975 contained twenty complicated and multi-faceted projects covering facilities, Scout Groups, leaders, youth training, staffing, funding, and even the future.

In 1980, Ma was awarded the 143rd Bronze Wolf, the only distinction of the World Organization of the Scout Movement, awarded by the World Scout Committee for exceptional services to world Scouting.
