= Trimeric intracellular cation-selective channel =

Protein

The trimeric intracellular cation-selective channels or TRIC proteins are a group of homo-trimeric cation channel proteins of ~300 residues in the ER membrane. There are two known TRIC proteins, TRIC-A and TRIC-B.

== Channel function ==
TRICs are permeable to both Na^{+} and K^{+} but not divalent cations like Ca^{2+}. They exhibit marked voltage-dependence, becoming more open when the cytosol is more positively charged than the ER lumen.

== TRIC-A ==
TRIC-A is predominantly expressed in excitable tissues including brain and skeletal muscle. TRIC-A activity is thought to support RyR1-mediated efflux of Ca^{2+} ions from the sarcoplasmic reticulum into the cytosol.

== TRIC-B ==
K^{+} flux into the ER through TRIC-B is thought to support IP_{3}-induced efflux of Ca^{2+} ions through IP_{3}-gated Ca^{2+} channels in the ER membrane.

== Clinical significance ==
TRIC-A has been implicated in the regulation of arterial blood pressure through regulating the excitability of vascular smooth muscle cells. Several single-nucleotide polymorphisms (SNPs) in close proximity to the TRIC-A locus and, in future, may serve as an important biomarker in the diagnosis of essential hypertension

Null mutations in TMEM38B encoding TRIC-B are an uncommon but relatively severe cause of autosomal recessive osteogenesis imperfecta or "brittle bone disease".
