= Jie Ma =

- Born: Lanzhou, China
- Genres: Chinese music, Classical music, fusion, jazz, jazz fusion, world music, improvisation
- Occupations: Musician, composer, performer
- Years active: 1992–present

Jie Ma (Chinese: 马捷; pinyin: Mǎ Jié) is a traditional Chinese musician who plays the pipa.
