= Qingyun Ma =

Chinese architect (born 1965)

- Born: 1965 (age 60–61); Xi'an, Shaanxi, China
- Occupation: Architect
- Practice: MADA s.p.a.m.
- Buildings: Qingpu Community Island Centennial TV and Radio Center Tianyi Square

Qingyun Ma (Chinese: 马清运; born 1965) is a Chinese architect.

== Early life and education ==
Born in Xi'an, Shaanxi province, Ma received a bachelor's degree in Civil Engineering in Architecture from Tsinghua University in Beijing. Later on, he pursued architecture at the Graduate School of Fine Art at the University of Pennsylvania.

== Career ==
=== Practise ===
In New York, he worked for several years at the firm Kohn Pedersen Fox. Also he became close to Rem Koolhaas on the first Harvard Project on the City, which he organized resulting in the book The Great Leap Forward.

In 1996, Ma founded MADA s.p.a.m. The architectural firm built over 1,204,000 square meters to date. In 2000, MADA s.p.a.m. formally established itself in Beijing, moving to Shanghai the following year. Included amongst MADA s.p.a.m's works are Qingpu Community Island in Shanghai, the Centennial TV and Radio Center in Xi'an, and Tianyi Square in Ningbo.

=== Teaching ===
Ma taught architecture in China at Shenzhen University, Tongji University, and Nanjing University; in Europe at the Berlage, the ETH, the Ecole Speciale d'Architecture in Paris and in Germany; and in the United States at Harvard University, the University of Pennsylvania, and Columbia University. Ma was the Dean of the University of Southern California School of Architecture from January 2007 through June 2017. In April 2020, Ma began serving as a member of the Board of Governors for the historic The School of Architecture founded by Frank Lloyd Wright in 1932.

== See also ==
- Ullens Center for Contemporary Art
