= Yuehu Mosque =

Mosque in Ningbo, Zhejiang, China

- 月湖清真寺
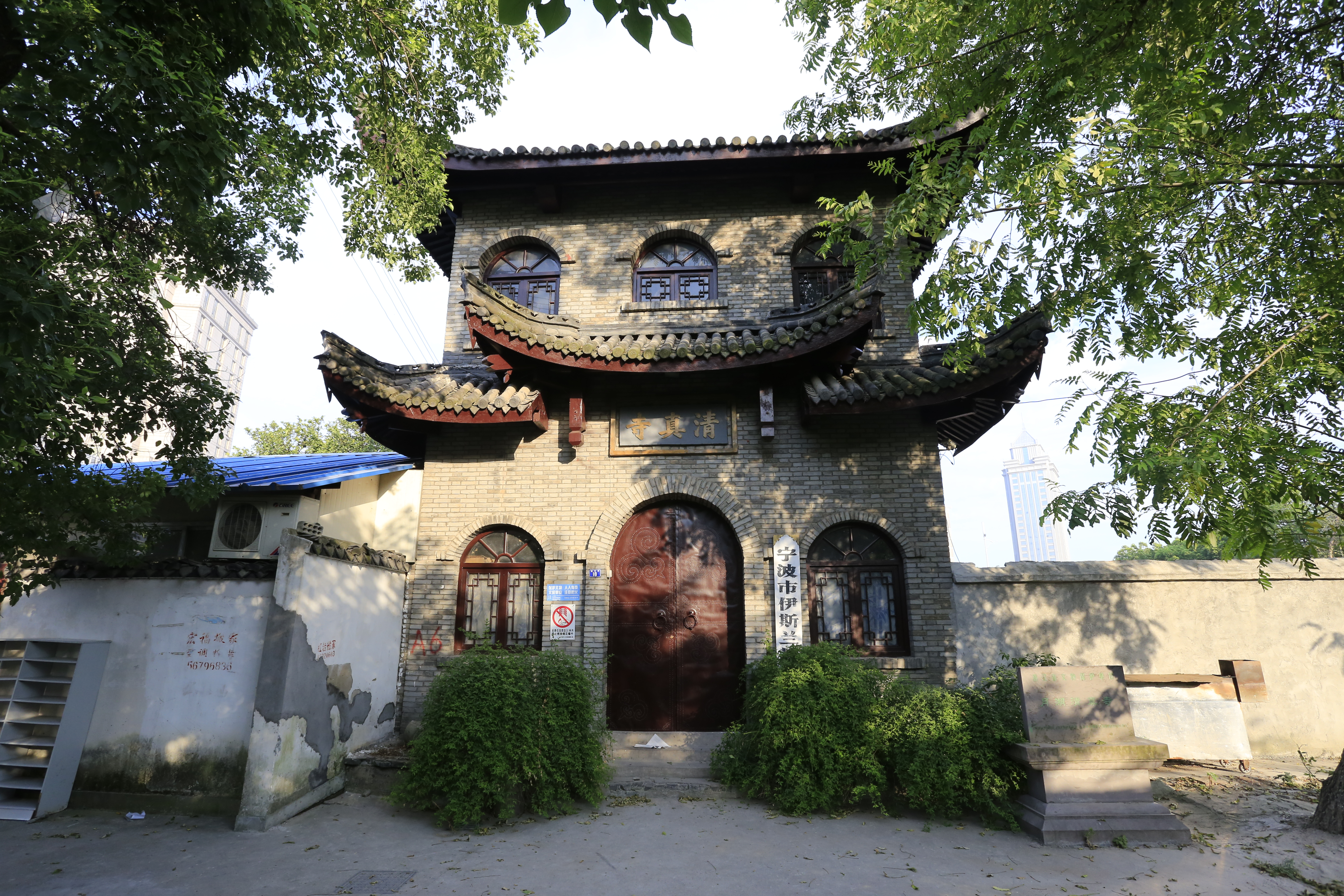

- Location of the mosque in Zhejiang

Religion
- Affiliation: Sunni Islam
- Ecclesiastical or organisational status: Mosque
- Status: Active

Location
- Location: Ningbo, Zhejiang
- Country: China
- Interactive map of Yuehu Mosque
- Coordinates: 29°52′08″N 121°32′25″E

Architecture
- Type: Mosque
- Style: Chinese
- Established: 1699

Chinese name
- Simplified Chinese: 月湖清真寺
Transcriptions
Standard Mandarin
- Hanyu Pinyin: Yuèhú Qīngzhēnsì

The Yuehu Mosque (Chinese: 月湖清真寺; pinyin: Yuèhú Qīngzhēnsì) is a mosque in Haishu District, Ningbo City, in the Zhejiang province of China.

== History ==
Hamada Hagras, in his 2017 study of the mosque, states that the mosque was constructed in 1003 CE during the reign of Emperor Zhenzong of the Song Dynasty. The mosque follows the traditional Chinese courtyard architectural style. Its main façade is located on the northeastern side, through which visitors enter a forecourt. On the southern side of this forecourt is the entrance to the main courtyard. The mosque complex includes a Moon Gate, storage rooms, and two teaching halls, while the prayer hall is situated on the western side of the complex. The mosque was constructed in 1699 during the reign of Kangxi Emperor of Qing Dynasty. In July 2011, the mosque was listed as a historical monument of Zhejiang Province.

== Transportation ==
The mosque is accessible within walking distance south of Ximenkou Station of Ningbo Rail Transit.

== See also ==
- Islam in China
- List of mosques in China
