= Bertha Hosang Mah =

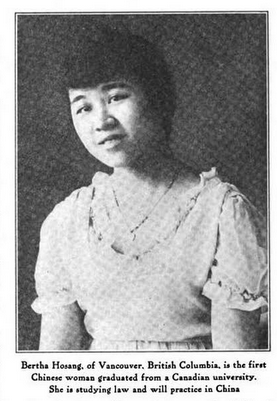
Bertha Hosang, from a 1918 publication

Bertha Hosang Mah (November 18, 1896 – 1959) was a Canadian student, the first Chinese woman to graduate from a Canadian university.

== Early life ==
Hosang was born in Lillooet, British Columbia, the daughter of Lena Hosang. Her older sister recalled, "We were the only Chinese family and there weren't any separate classes in the school, so we talked English all the time."

== Education ==
Hosang attended McGill University, first at the Vancouver satellite location (now the University of British Columbia), and later at the Montreal campus; when she graduated in 1917, she was described as "the first Chinese woman graduated from a Canadian university". At McGill, she won an award for best speech, from the Women's Literary Society (Delta Sigma). She also won first prize in a national essay competition, with her article "Physical Education for Chinese Women", which was later published in Chinese Students' Monthly.

Hosang was elected to the University Women's Club of Vancouver in 1918, and gave a presentation to the group that year, on "Chinese Literature". Hosang worked as a secretary at the Chinese consulate in Vancouver in 1918 and 1919. Her older sister Myrtle Hosang Lee studied economics at the University of California, Berkeley.

== Personal life ==
In May 1921, in Berkeley, California, Hosang married Dr. Ng Wing Mah, a Chinese-born political scientist who taught at the University of California. They had three children. Bertha Hosang Mah died in 1959, aged 62 years.
