= Teresa Wong =

Chinese musical artist

Teresa Wong 王曉南
- Born: China
- Occupation: Instrumentalist
- Instruments: Erhu, huqin
- Formerly of: Hong Kong Chinese Orchestra

Teresa Wong (Wong Hiu-nam, 王曉南) is a traditional Chinese huqin (erhu) player, originating from Hong Kong. She started her training at the age of six and studied at the Central Music Academy. She joined the China Central Orchestra after graduation and has performed with the Hong Kong Chinese Orchestra. She has been called the 'Vanessa-Mae of erhu'.

Her music is similar to the likes of artists such as 12 Girls Band or Vanessa-Mae. Her musical technique draws from the Huqin family of instruments used in the Tang dynasty (618 AD – 907 AD in China). Currently, Teresa has released a varied of albums, such as Longing for Ardour, and Modern Tang Allures.
