= Hae-Young Kee =

Canadian physicist

- Born: South Korea

Academic background
- Education: BSc, 1989, PhD, 1996, Seoul National University
- Thesis: Dynamical Properties of the Strongly Correlated Systems in Infinite Dimensions

Academic work
- Institutions: University of Toronto
- Main interests: theoretical condensed matter physics

Hae-Young Kee is a South Korea-born Canadian physicist. She is a Full professor and Tier 1 Canada Research Chair in the Theory of Quantum Materials at the University of Toronto. In recognition of her contributions to the theory of quantum materials, Kee has been elected a Fellow of the Royal Society of Canada and American Physical Society.

== Education ==
Kee was raised in South Korea. She earned her Bachelor of Science and PhD from Seoul National University. In 1991, Kee was part of the first cohort to be accepted into the International Centre for Theoretical Physics's Postgraduate Diploma Programme. While studying under Jongbae Hong and Patrik Fazekas, Kee began to focus on strongly correlated systems as an area of study.

== Career ==
Upon completing her studies at the International Centre for Theoretical Physics, Kee became a postdoctoral fellow at Rutgers University and Bell Laboratories. She credited her time spent in the Diploma Programme for improving her English. In 2001, Kee became an assistant professor in the Department of Physics at the University of Toronto. She also received a Tier 2 Canada Research Chair in Theoretical Condensed Matter Physics and was granted a Sloan Research Fellowship from the Alfred P. Sloan Foundation. As a professor at the University of Toronto, Kee focused her research on topological materials, frustrated magnetic systems, high-temperature superconductors, and electronic nematic liquids. In 2018, Kee was elected a Fellow of the American Physical Society for her contributions to the theory of quantum materials.

In 2020, Kee was appointed a Tier 1 Canada Research Chair in Theory of Quantum Materials. She was also named a Distinguished Fellow of the Asia Pacific Center for Theoretical Physics. In 2023, Kee received the Canadian Association of Physicists Brockhouse Medal "in recognition of her theoretical work in a variety of strongly correlated electron systems, particularly those in which spin-orbit coupling is important." The following year, she was elected a Fellow of the Royal Society of Canada.
