= José Plaridel Silvestre =

Filipino writer and Boy Scouts official

- Occupation: Writer
- Writing career
- Notable awards: Bronze Wolf

José Plaridel A. Silvestre was a writer and a senior official of the Boy Scouts of the Philippines, who served as the Asia-Pacific Regional Commissioner of the World Scout Bureau.

Silvestre, who had arrived in Greece earlier, avoided the plane crash of 28 July 1963, when the bulk of the Philippine contingent died en route to the 11th World Scout Jamboree in Marathon, Greece.

Silvestre conducted a management survey authorized by Henry C. Ma in 1975, which resulted in reforms of the Scout Association of Hong Kong.

In 1977, Silvestre was awarded the 123rd Bronze Wolf, the only distinction of the World Organization of the Scout Movement, awarded by the World Scout Committee for exceptional services to world Scouting.
