= Cheryl Forberg =

American chef and author

Cheryl Forberg, RD, is a New York Times best-selling author, a James Beard Award-winning chef, a registered dietitian (RD), a winegrape farmer and a travel writer. She lives in Northern California's wine country.

== Career ==
Cheryl Forberg began her career with a three-year post as a chef for several Bay Area, California restaurants including Wolfgang Puck’s Postrio Restaurant in San Francisco. She went on to become the private chef for filmmaker George Lucas and his family.

Forberg studied the effects of conjugated linoleic acid on lean body mass at USDA Center for Human Nutrition in San Francisco, after which she became the Research Dietitian for Cedars Sinai Hospital in Los Angeles, California, the Health Editor for Cooking.com, and recipe developer for the UCLA Department of Clinical Nutrition.

As the chef and nutritionist for NBC's show, The Biggest Loser, Forberg helped overweight contestants transform their bodies, health, and ultimately their lives. She shared cooking and nutrition tips with the contestants for seventeen seasons.

== Family life ==
Forberg lives in Napa, California, with her husband.

== Books and publications ==
- Cooking with Quinoa For Dummies (Wiley 2013)
- Flavor First (Rodale 2011), author
- The Biggest Loser Food Journal (Rodale 2010), contributor
- The Biggest Loser Six Weeks To A Healthier You (Rodale 2010), author, New York Times bestseller
- The Biggest Loser Simple Swaps (Rodale 2009), author, New York Times bestseller
- The Biggest Loser 30 Day Jumpstart (Rodale 2009), author, New York Times bestseller
- Positively Ageless: A 28-Day Plan to a Younger, Slimmer and Sexier You (2008 Rodale), author
- The Biggest Loser Success Secrets: The Wisdom, Motivation, and Inspiration to Lose Weight--and Keep It Off! (2008 Rodale), contributor, New York Times bestseller
- The Biggest Loser Fitness Program (2007 Rodale), contributor, New York Times bestseller
- The Biggest Loser Complete Calorie Counter (2006 Rodale), author
- The Biggest Loser: The Weight Loss Program to Transform Your Body, Improve Your Health, and Add Years to Your Life, contributor/recipe developer (Rodale 2005 New York Times bestseller)
- The Perricone Weight-Loss Diet: A Simple 3-Part Plan to Lose the Fat, the Wrinkles, and the Years by Nicholas Perricone MD (Ballantine Books 2005 New York Times bestseller), contributor/recipe developer
- The New Mayo Clinic Cookbook (Oxmoor), recipe developer (2005 James Beard Cookbook Award)
- Young for Life: The Best Antiaging Secrets for Women (Oxmoor 2004), contributor to nutrition chapter
- The American Medical Association Healthy Heart Cookbook (Meredith Books 2004), recipe developer
- Stop the Clock! Cooking: Defy Aging – Eat the Foods You Love (Penguin 2003), author

== Education ==
Forberg received her culinary education at the California Culinary Academy (CCA) in San Francisco, and her RD (Registered Dietician) credential from the University of California at Berkeley. She also has a bachelor's degree in French from the University of Hawaii at Manoa.
