= Michelle Mah =

American chef (born 1975)

- Born: April 14, 1975 (age 51); Seoul, South Korea
- Education: University of California; The College of Food in San Diego; California Culinary Academy
- Culinary career
- Cooking style: California Asian
- Previous restaurants
- Café Japengo, San Diego, CA; Moose's, San Francisco, CA; Jianna, San Francisco, CA; Turtle Bay Resort, Saint John, U.S. Virgin Islands; Belon, San Francisco, CA; Grand Cafe, San Francisco, CA (?—2005); Ponzu, San Francisco, CA (2005–2008); Midi, San Francisco, CA (2008–2010); The Brixton, San Francisco, CA (2010–2011); Wo Hing General Store, San Francisco, CA (2011–2012); The Slanted Door, San Francisco, CA (2012–2016)

Michelle Mah is an American chef. She is the director of operations for The Slanted Door Group in San Francisco, California. She was previously the chef de cuisine at The Slanted Door, consulting chef at The Brixton, and executive chef at Midi.

== Early life ==
Michelle Mah was born in 1975 in Seoul, South Korea. At age three, she moved with her family to San Dimas, California. Her mother, grandmother, and father all cooked at home. In 1997, she earned her B.A. in Ethnic Studies and a minor in General Literature from University of California, San Diego.

== Career ==
Mah's culinary experience began at Café Japengo in San Diego under chef Amiko Gubbins, who inspired her to enroll in the nearby College of Food, where she graduated with an associate degree in Occupational Studies. She continued her education at California Culinary Academy (CCA) in San Francisco. She stayed in San Francisco and worked at Moose's as a pantry cook and later completed her externship for CCA at Turtle Bay resort in Saint John, U.S. Virgin Islands. When she returned, she worked as a sous chef at Paul Arenstam's Belon and later at the Grand Café, where Arenstam was executive chef. When she was offered a position as executive chef at Kimpton's Ponzu, an upscale Asian restaurant, Arenstam was very supportive and assured her she was ready for the challenge, regardless of her fears.

In 2005, she accepted the role and was named one of San Francisco Chronicle's "Rising Star Chefs" of 2006 along with Corey Lee of French Laundry and Mike Yakura of Le Colonial. Mah told Nation's Restaurant News that she studied and researched different recipes before she felt comfortable developing her own vision for Ponzu which incorporated some Korean cuisine. The Today Show described her approach to Asian cuisine as what she calls "Asia without a map." In 2008, she left Ponzu to join Joie de Vivre's new restaurant Midi in San Francisco's theatre district as executive chef. The San Francisco Chronicle wrote that Mah's recipes at the restaurant, this time based on European cuisine, "creates a fantasy voyage." She left Midi in 2010 to "take the opportunity to remember why I love cooking in the first place" and said she was interested in working at an independent restaurant or starting one of her own.

Mah worked as a consulting chef at the Brixton in 2010. In 2011, she joined Charles Phan's Slanted Door Group to lead Wo Hing's General Store, a Chinese street food-inspired restaurant in San Francisco's Mission District. She then moved to The Slanted Door in 2012, where she served as chef de cuisine. In 2016, she transitioned into the role of Director of Operations for the Slanted Door Group, overseeing restaurant operations across the organization.

In 2016, Mah participated in a collaboration with the Asian Art Museum tied to the exhibition of "meat shaped stone," in which participating chefs created side dishes inspired by the artwork. She has also contributed restaurant reviews and recommendations through the dining platform Chefsfeed.

As Director of Operations, Mah was playing tennis with Charles Phan on January 29, 2025, when he had a heart attack and died later at a San Francisco hospital of cardiac arrest.

== Awards ==
- "Rising Star Chef" (2006) by the San Francisco Chronicle
