= Ma Jung-kil =

South Korean baseball player

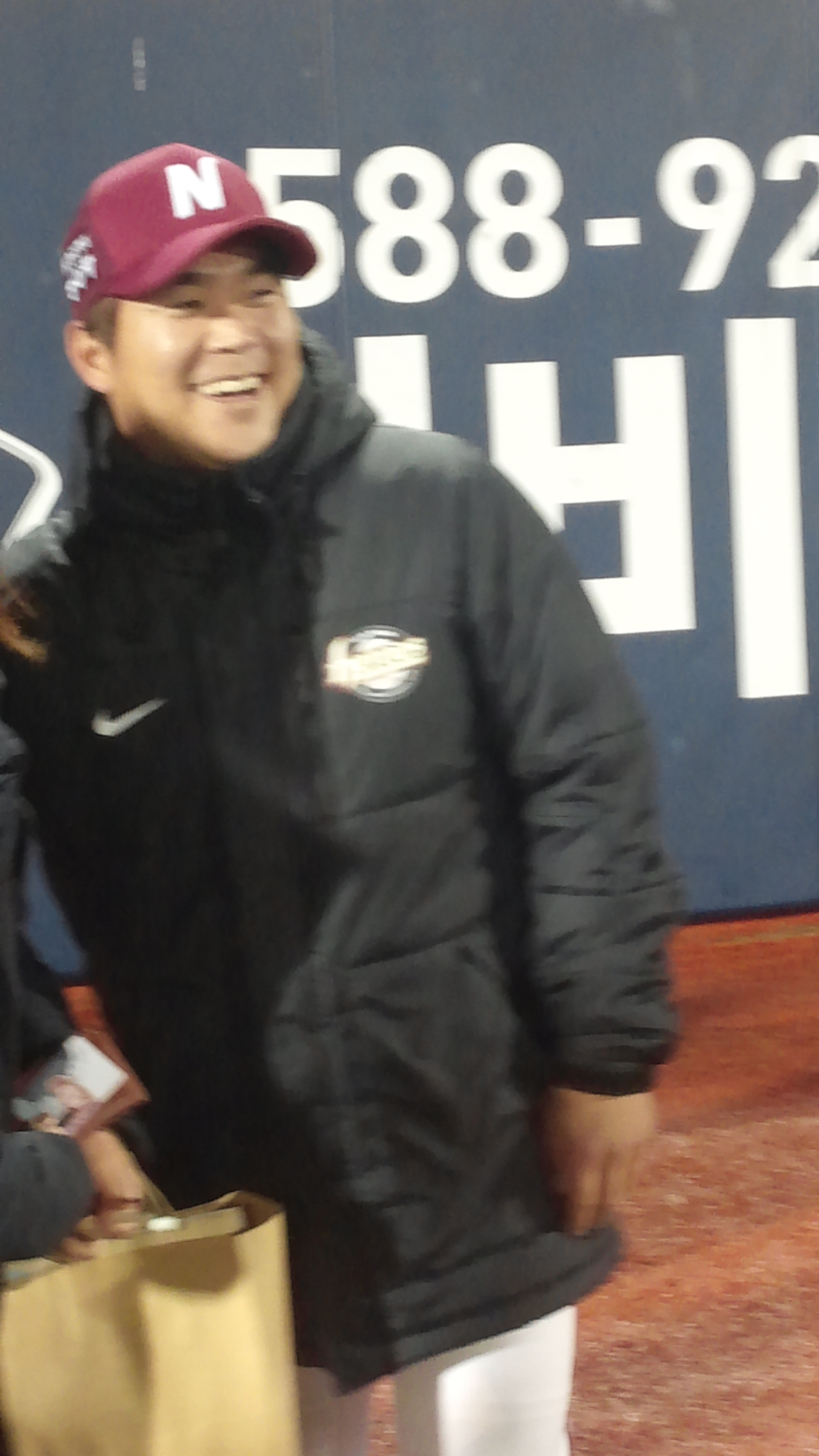

Nexen Heroes – No. 21
- Relief pitcher
- Born: March 13, 1979 (age 46)
- Bats: Right Throws: Right

KBO debut
- 2002, for the Hanwha Eagles

KBO statistics (through 2012 Season)
- Win–loss record: 13-16
- Saves: 13
- Holds: 40
- Earned run average: 3.98
- Strikeouts: 350

Teams
- Hanwha Eagles (2002–2009); Nexen Heroes (2010–present)

Ma Jung-kil (Korean: 마정길; Hanja: 馬正吉; born March 13, 1979, in Cheongju, Chungcheongbuk-do) is a South Korean sidearm relief pitcher who plays for the Nexen Heroes of the KBO League. He bats and throws right-handed.

== Amateur career ==
Ma attended Cheongju Technical High School. In 1997, he was selected for the South Korean junior national team and competed in the World Junior Baseball Championship held in Moncton, Canada. Ma was drafted by the Hanwha Eagles in 1998 in the 2nd round and as the 111th pick overall.

However, Ma decided to enter the Eagles after graduation from college and continued to play baseball at Dankook University in Cheonan, Chungcheongnam-do. During his collegiate years at Dankook University, Ma was considered one of the top sidearm/submarine pitchers along with Chong Tae-Hyon of Kyung Hee University. As a sophomore, he was first called up to the South Korea national baseball team for the 3-Nations Invitational Baseball Tournament held in Taiwan.

In 2000, Ma helped his team to win the President's Flag Collegiate Baseball Championship. After the championship, he was selected for the South Korean collegiate national team and competed in the friendly baseball series again the United States national baseball team.

As a senior in 2001, Ma led his team to win the National Amateur Baseball Championship where he was named best pitcher.

=== Notable international careers ===
Year	Venue	Competition	Team
1997	Canada	World Junior Baseball Championship	5th
1999	Chinese Taipei	3 Nations Invitational Baseball Tournament	Silver medal
2000	United States	South Korea vs USA Baseball Series	1W-4L
2001	Chinese Taipei	Asian Baseball Championship	Silver medal

== Professional career ==
Upon graduation from Dankook University in 2002, Ma entered the Hanwha Eagles. He had a mediocre rookie season, going 2-5 with 6 saves and 6 holds in 59 games and posted a 5.40 ERA in 60.0 innings pitched as a relief pitcher. In 2003, Ma lowered his ERA to 4.06 and amassed 2 saves and 9 holds appearing in 63 games as a setup man. In 2004, however, he appeared in just 33 games due to injuries. After the 2004 season, Ma left the Unicorns to serve the two-year military service.

Ma joined the Hanwha Eagles again in 2007 when he was discharged from the military duty.

Ma was sidelined with a left knee ligament rupture in the second half of the 2011 season and missed the entire 2012 season.

=== Notable international careers ===
Year	Venue	Competition	Team
2002	Cuba	Intercontinental Cup	Silver medal
