= Ma Xiaohui =

Erhu player and composer from Shanghai

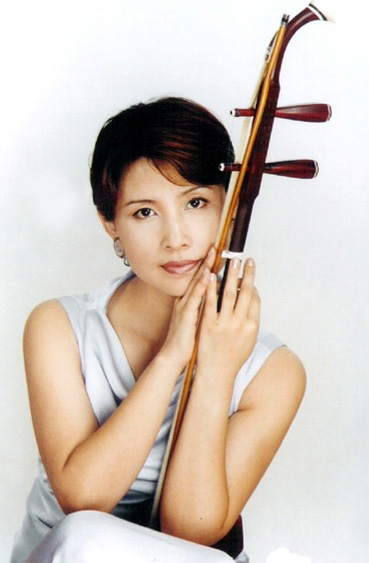
Xiaohui Ma

Ma Xiaohui (simplified Chinese: 马晓晖; traditional Chinese: 馬曉暉; pinyin: Mǎ Xiǎohuī) is an erhu player and composer from Shanghai, People's Republic of China. She is one of China's few first-class traditional artists embracing an international career. Critics have referred to her as "an artist who speaks with the world through Erhu" and "a musician who plays with heart."

Ma is perhaps most readily recognized for her duet with famed cellist Yo-Yo Ma on the Oscar - winning soundtrack for the film Crouching Tiger, Hidden Dragon. The Kennedy Center for the Performing Arts regarded her 1999 Millennium Stage performance among that year's ten finest concerts.

Raised in an academic family and having played erhu since age six, Ma graduated from the Shanghai Conservatory of Music, and served as concert master for the Shanghai Traditional Orchestra before commencing her independent career. Among her diverse associations, Miss Ma is a member of the United Nations Oriental Art Center, guest professor at Southwest Jiaotong University (Chengdu),a love envoy of the 2007 World Special Olympics, and Cultural Ambassador to the 2010 World Exposition in Shanghai. She also advises the Hong Kong Youth Music Association and the Ningbo Folk Music Orchestra, as well as directing her own Shanghai Xiaohui Art Center.

== Career ==
Equally at home on television or stage, Xiaohui Ma toured extensively across Europe, Asia, and the Americas since the late 1990s, appearing with noted orchestras in more than one hundred concerts in addition to presenting several-fold more lectures. European appearances have included the Berlin Chamber Orchestra, the Hamburg Philharmonic Orchestra, the French National Symphony Orchestra, Switzerland's Symphony Orchestra St. Gallen, and the Lithuanian State Symphony Orchestra (their first Chinese performer). Many of her recitals featured her global "Erhu Dialogues," a musical conversation encompassing Oriental and Western civilization. Notable recent European performances included a recital for the King and Queen of Sweden (2007) along with Chinese President Hu Jintao.

In North America, her programs included performances with conductor David Stern at Colorado's Crested Butte Music Festival (2007) and the American Youth Philharmonic Orchestra of Washington, DC (2007), as well as the Kennedy Center for the Performing Arts (1999, 2006) and at Mt. Vernon for the White House Historical Society (2007). She also appeared at the United Nations, at New York Philharmonic conductor Lorin Maazel's Castleton Theater (Châteauville Foundation), with the Mexican National Symphony Orchestra, and at an internationally televised program at the famed Crystal Cathedral in Orange County, California. In 2008, Miss Ma performed in New York City for her debut at the Weill Hall at Carnegie Hall.

In Asia, Xiaohui Ma has performed with the National Symphony Orchestra of China, the Hong Kong Philharmonic Orchestra, Japan's NHK Symphony Orchestra, the Singapore National Symphony, and at Classical Concert Hall in Seoul, Korea, among others. Chinese Premier Wen Jiabao's Shanghai African summit in Shanghai presented Miss Ma's artistry to African heads of state (2006) and she earlier represented China at Bravo China in Athens, Greece (2002) and as lead musician for the APEC meeting in Shanghai (1999). Miss Ma is often seen in television music specials on Chinese CCTV and Chinese MTV.

Appearing in over 40 CDs, Xiaohui Ma has also composed numerous pieces, including her major works "The Spirit of My Erhu" (琴韵) and "The Story of Two Strings" (弦之炼, premiered at the Beethoven House in Bonn, Germany). Among her significant adaptations of Western and Chinese classical compositions are Béla Bartók's "Romanian Folk Dances," Johann Sebastian Bach's "Inventions II" and Sonatas, Fritz Kreisler's "Liebesleid," and the Ping Tan Opera "Call Mother in the Nunnery." World premieres include "Wailing Waters," "Chant & Allegro," "Maiden Lan Hua-Hua," "Genghis Khan," "The Shepherd Girl," "Hard to Say Good-Bye," "Night Color in the Desert," and "Deep at Night."

A respected music scholar, she has also lectured at dozens of world universities, including the University of Notre Dame, Northwestern University, University of Michigan, Pomona College, Fudan University, and Jiaotong University. In 2007, Azusa Pacific University hosted her as World Music Scholar-in-Residence, and she conducted a concert at Scripps College in collaboration with Claremont Graduate University's transdisciplinary course, "Shanghai Rising."

== Reception ==
Xiaohui Ma has redefined the erhu, elevating it to a fine classical standing, stretching her ancient, versatile instrument's boundaries with new tone colors and techniques. The German Saale newspaper recognized this: "Miss Ma is a brilliant interpreter, mastering virtuously all possibilities of her tender instrument and playing her truly personal interpretation with enormous humor and refinement . . . in which she could show, once again, her breathtaking virtuosity." Shanghai Grand Theatre Magazine noted she "demonstrates her continuous creativity and truthfulness to her own personality, touching, through her music, the entire audience." The South Bend Tribune added: "Ma Xiaohui's Erhu is able to evoke not just traditional Chinese musical themes—the twitter of bird song or the distinct cadence and intonation of Chinese speech—but the emotional variety of Western music as well. She strives to span cultural divides and emphasizes the universality of music."

Diverse Europeans critics particularly praise China's rare flower in the garden of traditional music. Nuremberg Daily said, "Erhu, an ordinary instrument in appearance, gains an incredible strength through the interpretation of Ma Xiaohui." Munich Times said "with nimble virtuosity… that we fully believed again in music as a universal language." Oxford Times agreed that "she drew a kind of alto human voice bereft of words," and her playing "sounds so culture-free and universal, that Ma Xiaohui's gift, and vibrant musicality, shone out on us like light." The Swiss press wrote that one is "almost startled by the powerful sound of the instrument that reminds of a human voice and how this is able to express itself emotionally." Germany's Donaukurier captured the artist's essence: "Ma Xiaohui proved to be a magnificent Erhu player who, as if by magic, produced out of the two strings fantastic sound effects. The fantastic virtuosity and musicality of the soloist unified the poetic imitations of singing birds, subtly drawn and melodious bows, elegiac songs, and comedian dialogues…the disparate elements drawn from the Chinese tradition and the western modernity were blended into a unity through the intensive creative power of the artist."

== Awards and recognition ==
- 2005—"Erhu with Piano" Dialogue, Top Ten Ensembles, Grand Theatre, Shanghai
- 2003—Outstanding Women Music Trio, Shanghai International Music Festival
- 2001—Top Prize, First Shanghai International Spring Music Festival
- 2000—Featured in duet with Yo-yo Ma on Oscar-winning film soundtrack for Crouching Tiger, Hidden Dragon, composed by Tan Dun
- 1999—Ten Best Concerts at the Millennium Stage, Kennedy Center for the Performing Arts
- 1999—Shanghai Bao Gang Award for Ten Best Artists
- 1998—Great Artist, Shanghai International Spring Music Festival
- 1995—Shanghai Bao Gang Award for Ten Best Artists
- 1993—First Shanghai Most Excellent Young Performing Artist Award nomination
- 1993—New Work Performance Award, 15th Music Spring Festival of Shanghai & Top Ten Excellent Youth Musical Performer nomination
- 1987—Top Prize, National Guangdong Music Competition (Gaohu Section)

== Discography ==
Appearing in more than 40 CDs, Xiaohui Ma is featured as principal in over 20 CDs and has appeared in numerous television interviews discussing her CDs and music. Some of Ma's critically acclaimed CDs and DVDs include:

- Erhu Around the World (DVD/CD album & 24 pp. photo-booklet), Slav, Shanghai (2006)
- Spirit of My Erhu—Ma Xiaohui Special Features No. 1, Slav, Shanghai (2006)
- Four Seasons of Erhu—Romance, Ma Xiaohui Special Features No. 2, Slav, Shanghai (2006)
- New Colors from China (with Li Biao, Percussion), Deutsche Welle, Germany (2003)
- Deep Night, Bailey Record Co. Ltd, Hong Kong (2003)
- Hua, King Record Co., Tokyo (2003)
- Petite Fleur, King Record Co., Tokyo (2002)
- Birds Singing in Lonesome Mountains (with Tim Ovens, Klavier), Cordaria, Hannover, Germany (2000)
- The Spirit of My Erhu, Polygram Far East, Hong Kong (1998)
- On the Grasslands, Hay Ung Music, Shanghai (1997)
