= Regional cuisine =

Cuisine based upon national regions

Regional cuisine is cuisine based upon national, state or local regions. Regional cuisines may vary based upon food availability and trade, varying climates, cooking traditions and practices, and cultural differences. One noteworthy definition is based upon traditional cuisine: "A traditional cuisine is a coherent tradition of food preparation that rises from the daily lives and kitchens of a people over an extended period in a specific region of a country, or a specific country, and which, when localized, has notable distinctions from the cuisine of the country as a whole." Regional food preparation traditions, customs and ingredients often combine to create dishes unique to a particular region. Regional cuisines are often named after the geographic areas or regions that they originate from.
