= Haishu, Ningbo =

Haishu 海曙区
- District
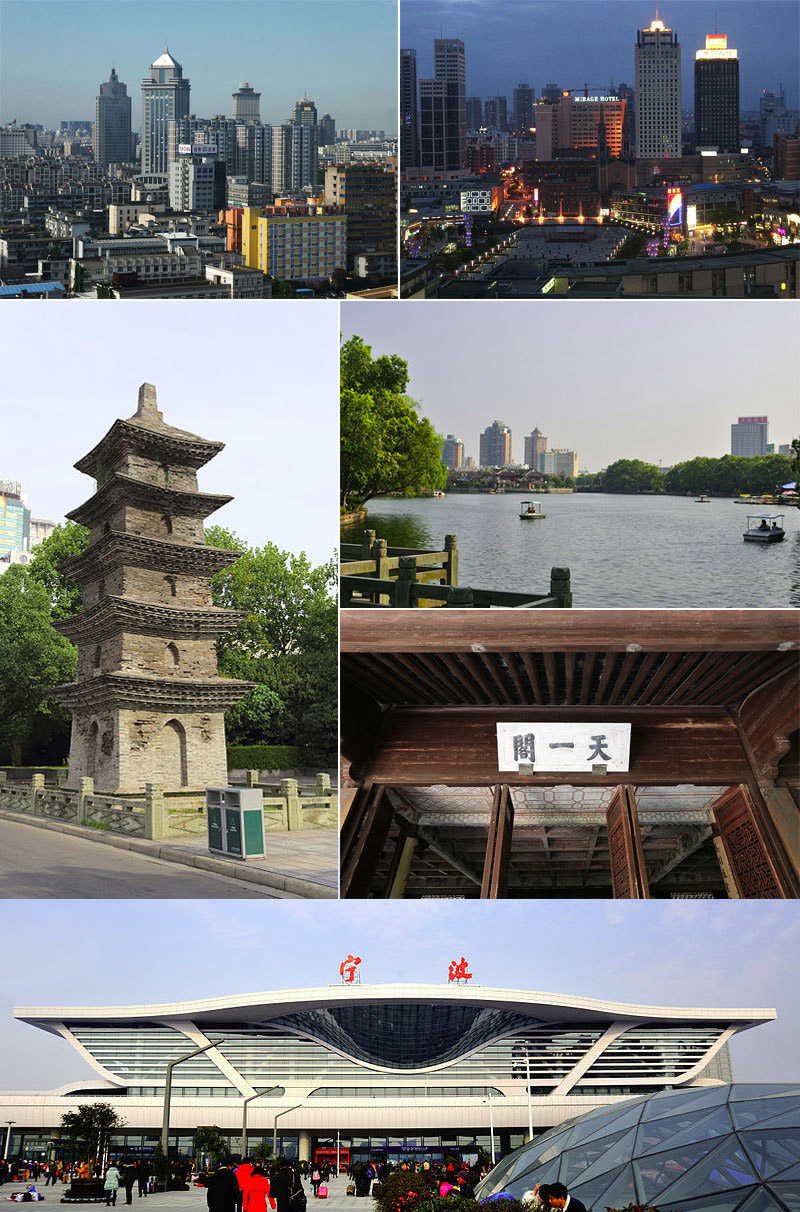
- Clockwise from the top: Haishu skyline, Tianyi Square, Xiantong Tower, Crescent Lake, Tianyige, Ningbo Railway Station

- Haishu District in Ningbo

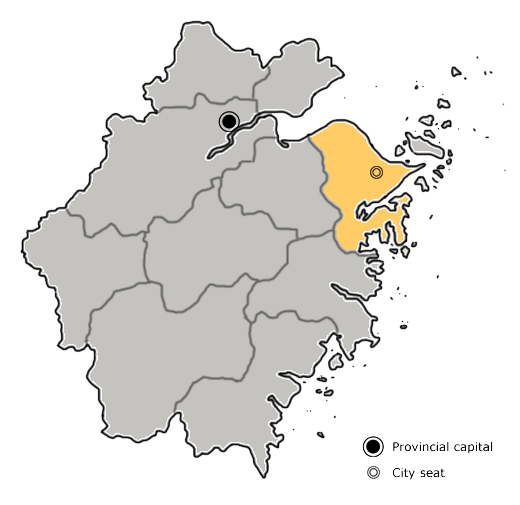
- Ningbo in Zhejiang
- Coordinates: 29°52′N 121°33′E
- Country: People's Republic of China
- Province: Zhejiang
- Sub-provincial city: Ningbo

Area
  - Total: 595.19 km^{2} (229.80 sq mi)

Population (2017)
  - Total: 909,000
- Time zone: UTC+8 (China Standard)
- Website: www.haishu.gov.cn

Haishu (Chinese: 海曙; pinyin: Hǎishǔ) is a county-level district under the jurisdiction of Ningbo city in Zhejiang Province of the People's Republic of China.

Since the district has a drum tower (gulou) that was constructed during the Tang dynasty, it is alternatively called "Haishu Lou". The district's total area is 29 square kilometers, and its population is 280,000 people. The district's postal code is 315000. The district people's government is located at 229 Lingqiao Road.

== Administrative regions ==
The district administers eight streets, 66 communities, and 16 administrative villages.

Street offices: Lingta Street, Yuehu Street, Gulou Street, Nanmen Street, Ximen Street, Baiyun Street, Duantang Street, and Wangchun Street.

== Education ==
Ningbo University of Technology (previously Ningbo College) was formerly located in the district.

== Tourist attractions ==
- Tashan Weir
- Yuehu Mosque
