= Mokcheon Ma clan =

Korean clan from South Chungcheong Province

- Country: Korea
- Current region: Cheonan
- Founder: Ma Ryeo
- Connected members: Mah Chonggi; Ma Kwang-soo

Mokcheon Ma clan (Korean: 목천 마씨; Hanja: 木川 馬氏) is one of the Korean clans. Their Bon-gwan is in Cheonan, South Chungcheong Province. They were sorted the same kind of clans as Jangheung Ma clan. According to the research held in 2000, the number of the Mokcheon Ma clan was 2982. Ma clan began when (Hanja: 馬浣) became the member of Gojoseon with Gija. Their founder was Ma Ryeo who was one of the leading members of Baekje’s foundation.

== See also ==
- Korean clan names of foreign origin
