= Ma Hae-young =

South Korean baseball player (born 1970)

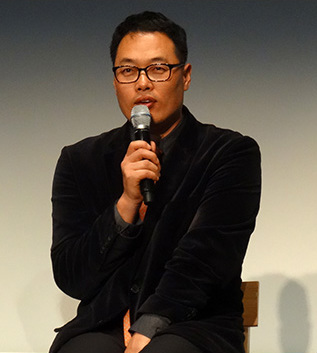
- Infielder
- Born: August 14, 1970 (age 55); Busan
- Batted: Right Threw: Right

KBO debut
- April 15, 1995, for the Lotte Giants

Last appearance
- June 20, 2008, for the Lotte Giants

KBO statistics
- Batting average: .294
- Hits: 1,609
- Home runs: 260
- Runs batted in: 1,003
- Stats at Baseball Reference

Teams
- Lotte Giants (1995–2000); Samsung Lions (2001–2003); Kia Tigers (2004–2005); LG Twins (2006–2007); Lotte Giants (2008)

Career highlights and awards
- Korean Series champion (2002); KBO League Golden Glove Award (2002); Korean Series Most Valuable Player Award (2002)

- Ma Hae-young
- Hangul: 마해영
- Hanja: 馬海泳
- RR: Ma Haeyeong
- MR: Ma Haeyŏng

Ma Hae-young (Korean: 마해영; born August 14, 1970) is a retired South Korean professional baseball infielder who played for 14 seasons in the KBO League.
