= Ningbo =

Prefecture-level & sub-provincial city in China

Ningbo 宁波市 Ningpo
- Prefecture-level and sub-provincial city
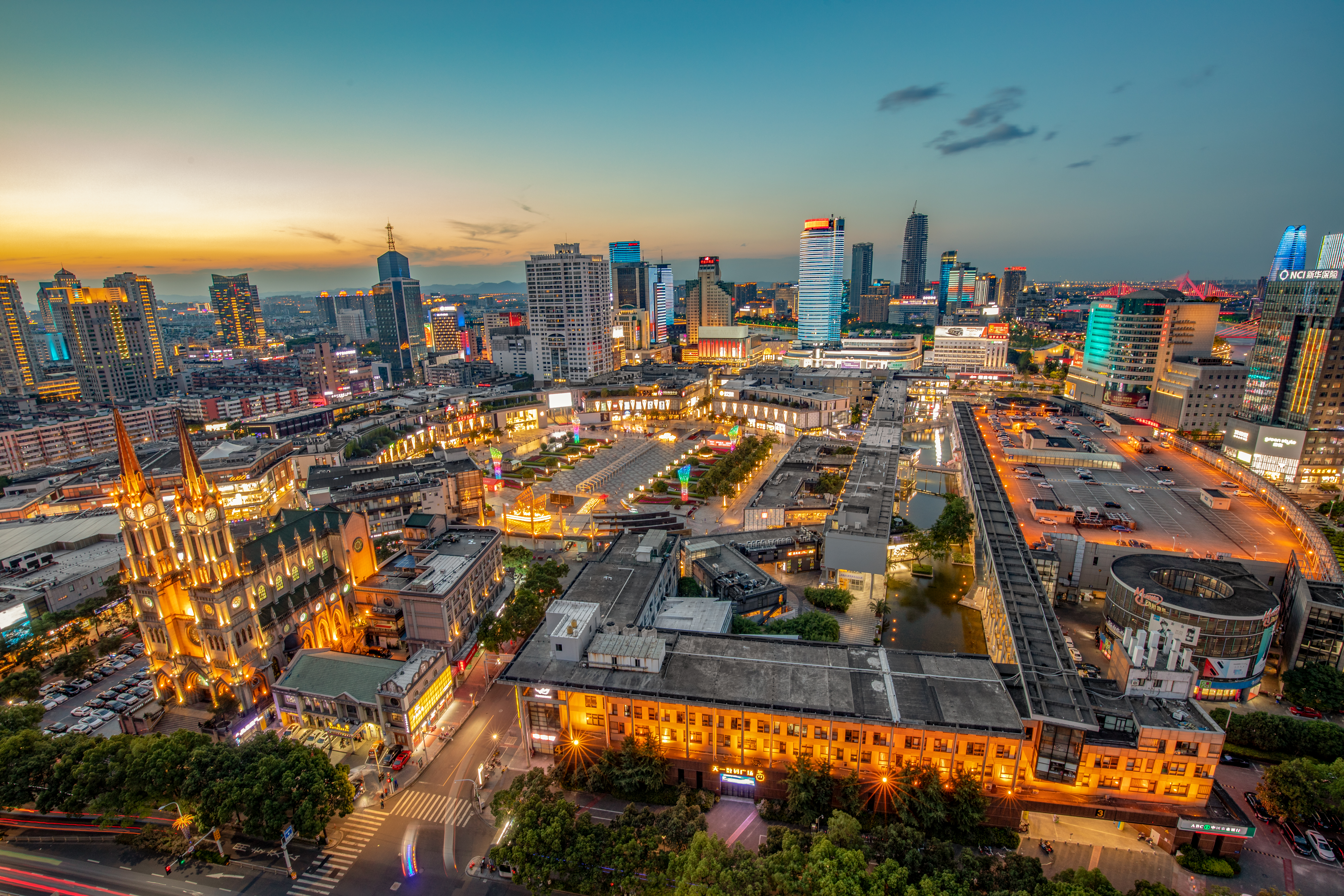
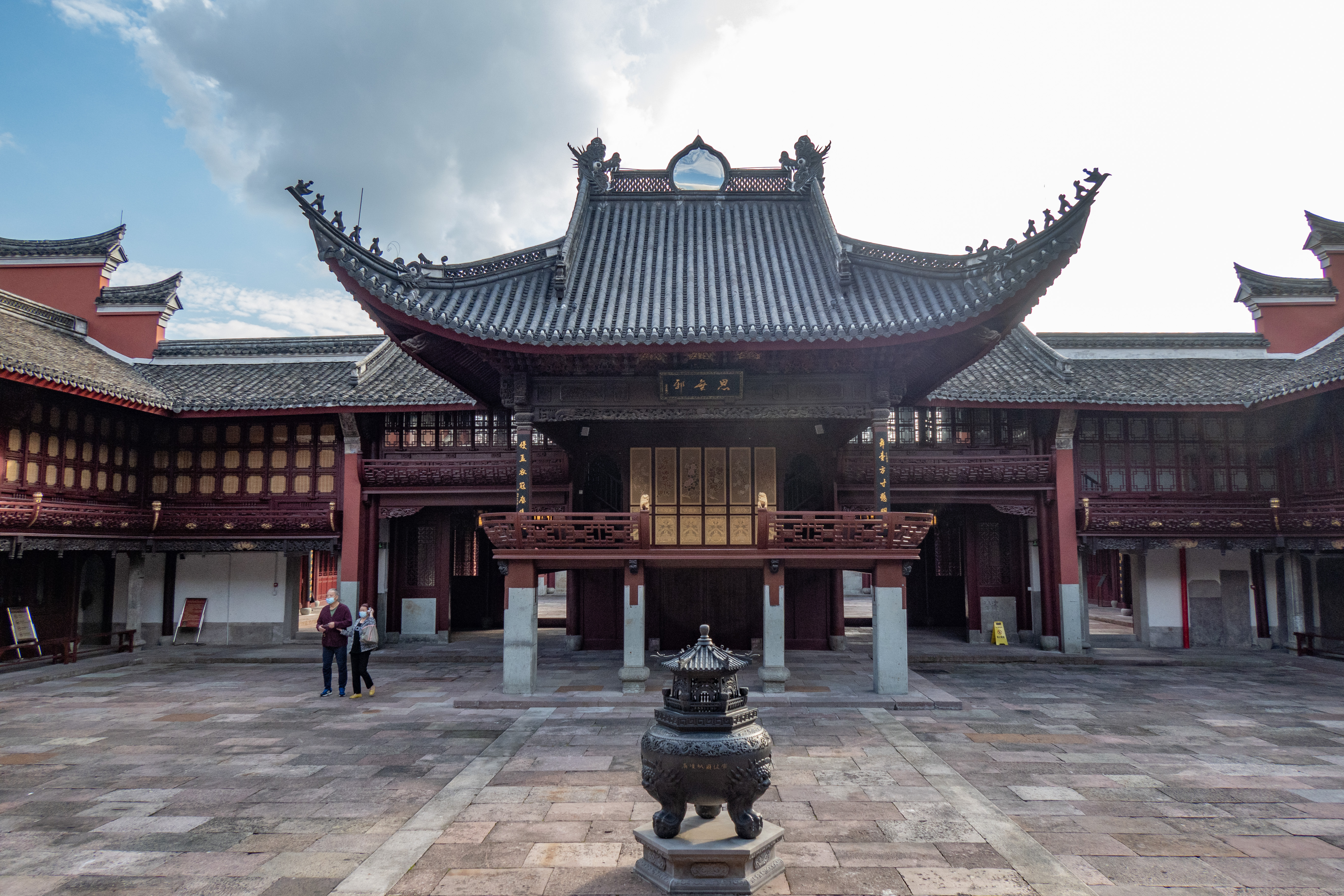
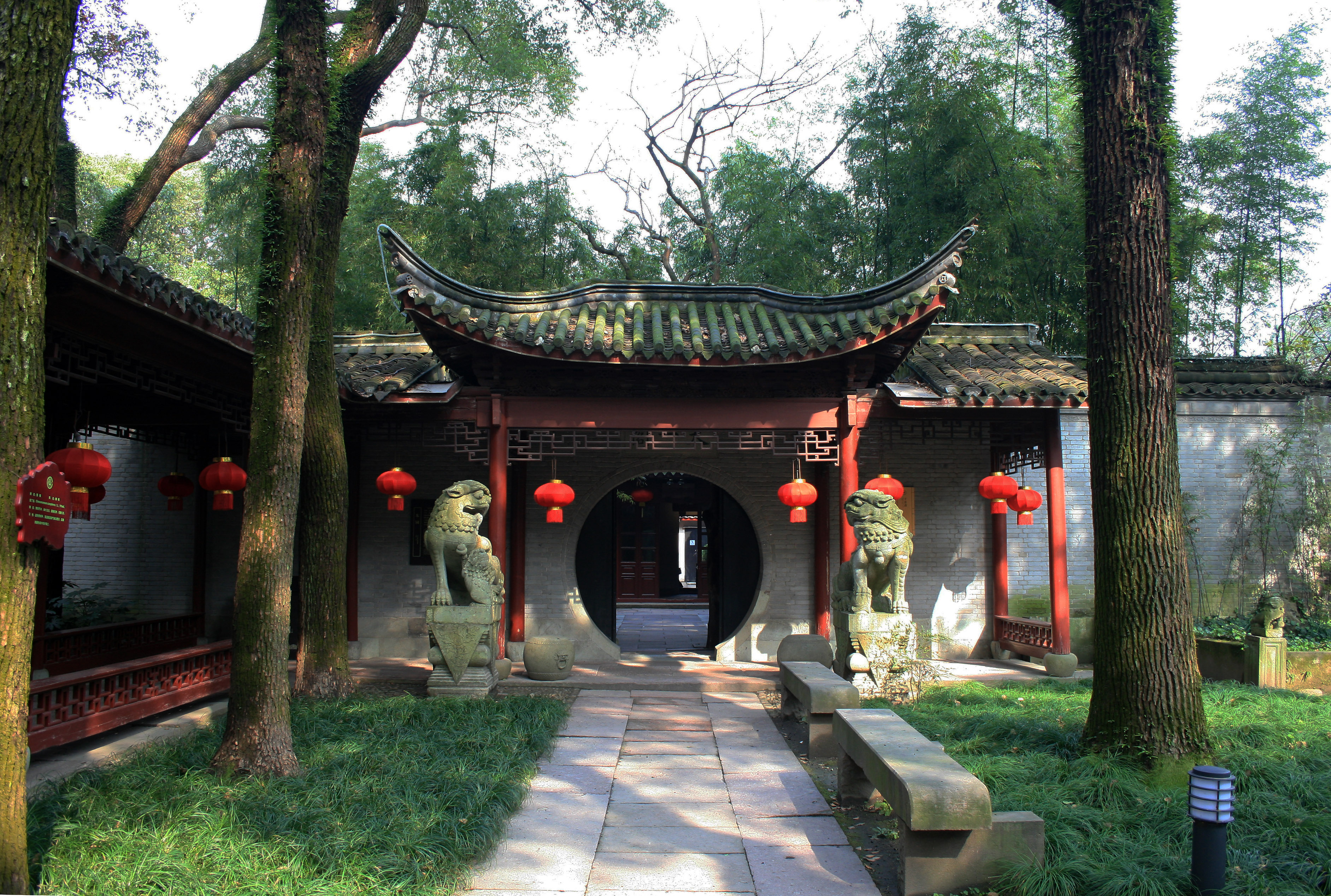
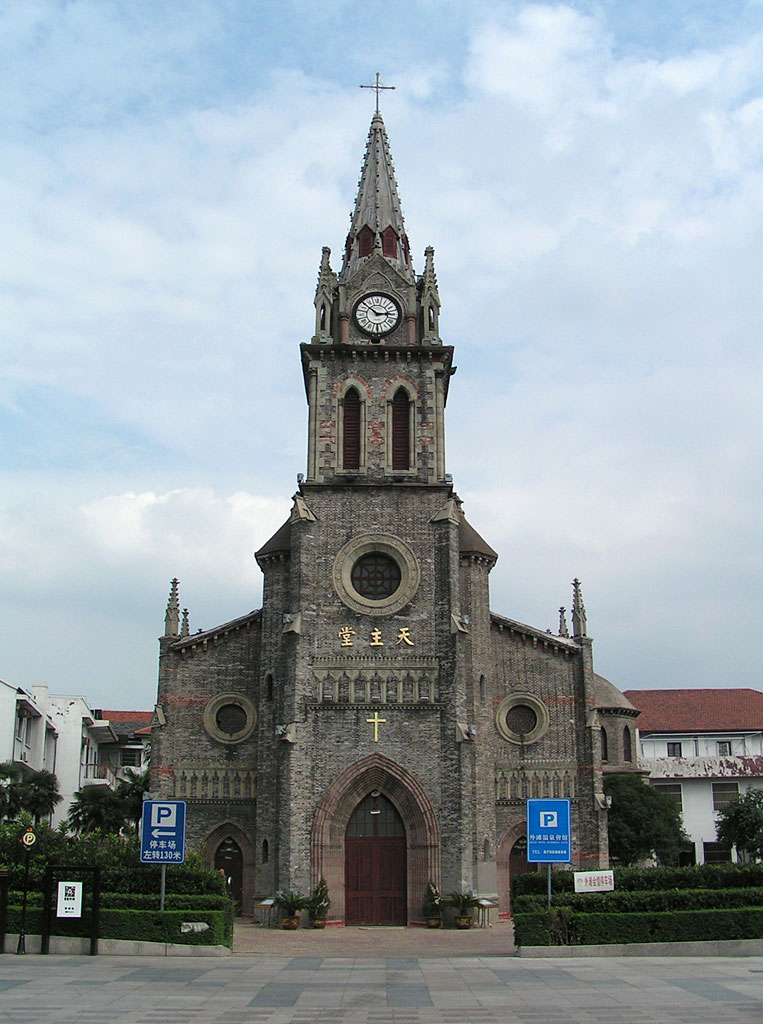
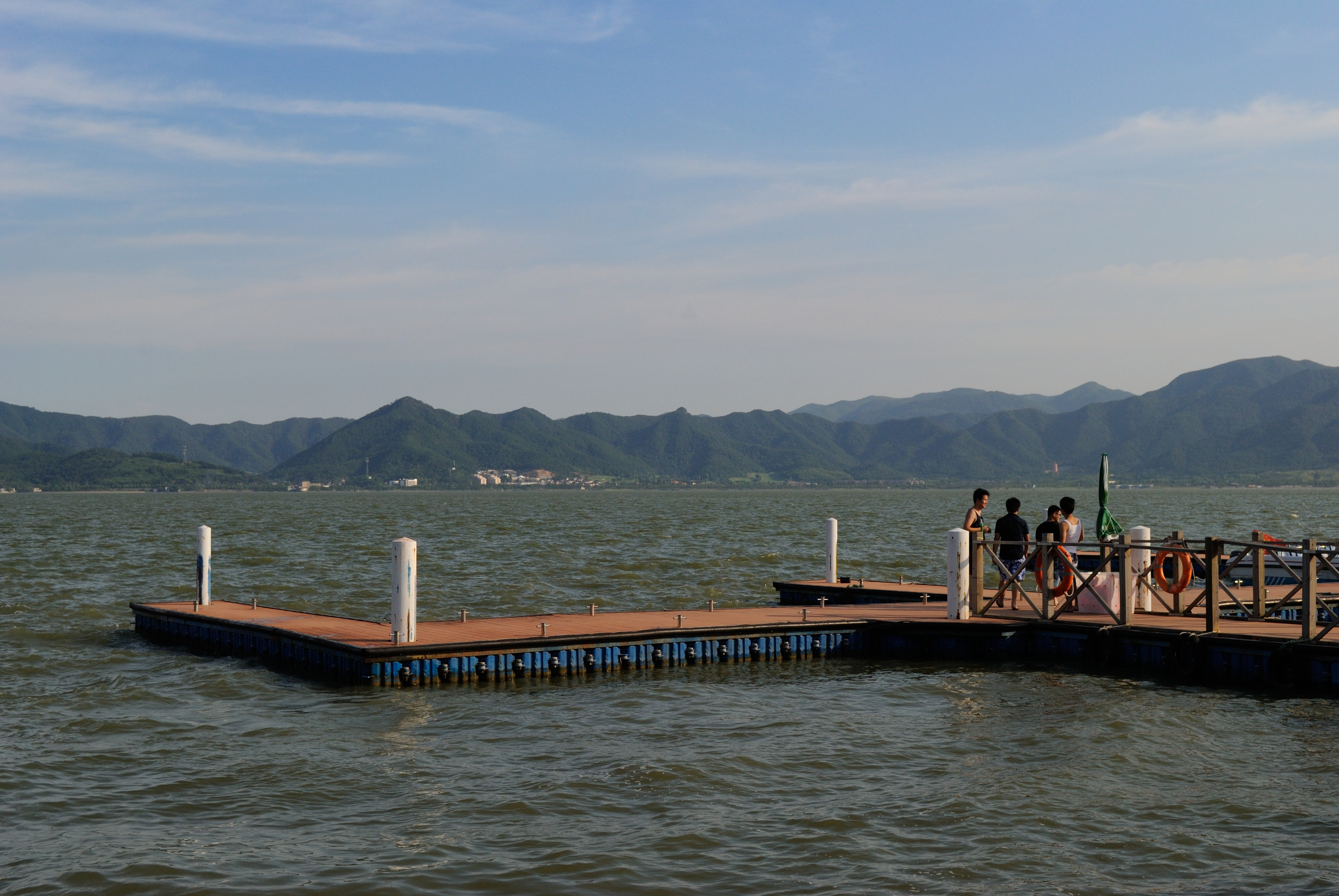
- Tianyi Square Ningbo City God Temple Tianyi Pavilion Moon Lake Ningbo Museum Sacred Heart Cathedral, Ningbo Dongqian Lake

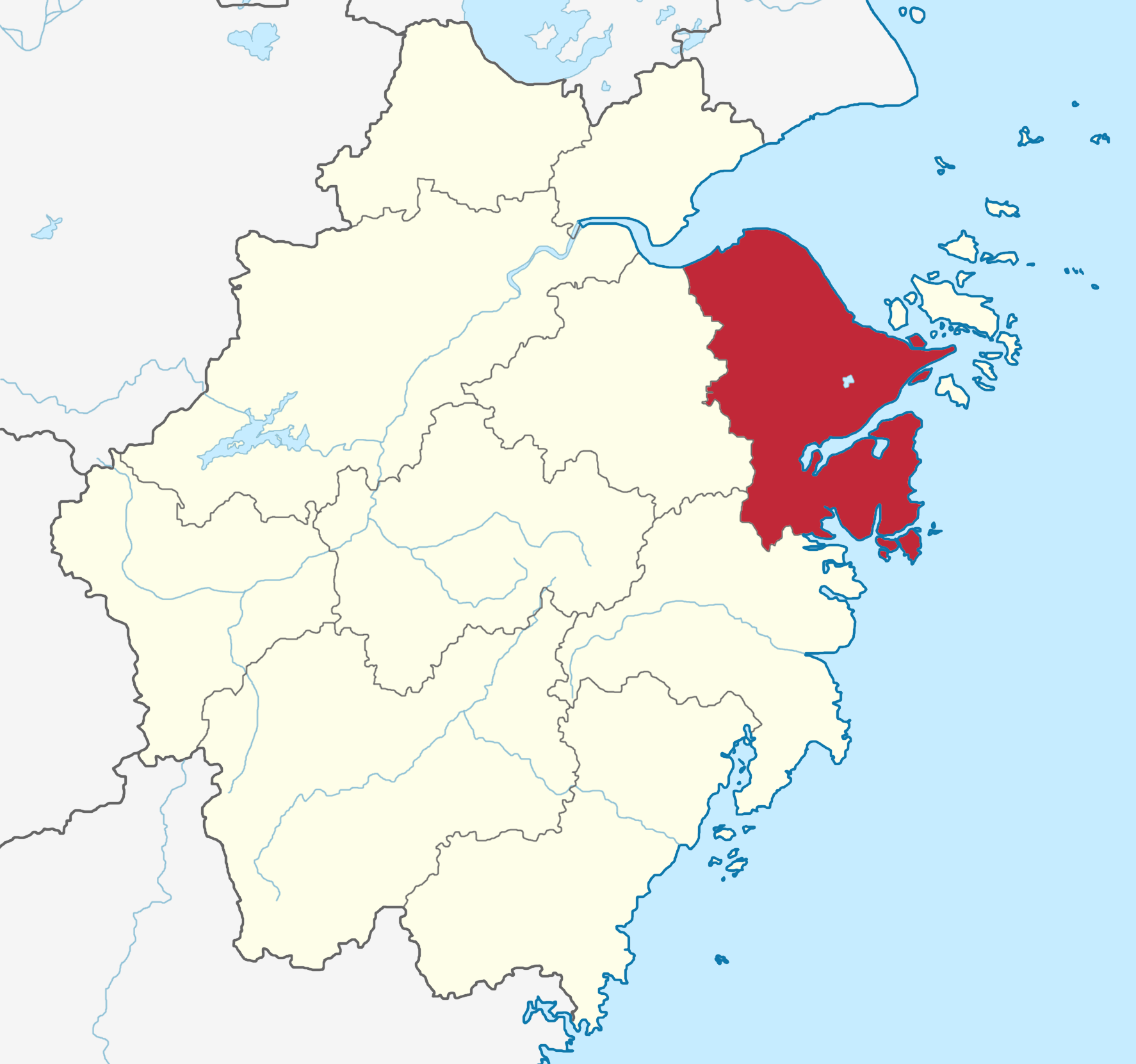
- Ningbo City in Zhejiang

- Location in China
- Coordinates (Tianyi Square): 29°52′08″N 121°33′14″E
- Country: China
- Province: Zhejiang
- County-level divisions: 11
- Township divisions: 148
- Municipal seat: Yinzhou

Government
  - Type: Sub-provincial city
  - Body: Ningbo Municipal People's Congress
  - CCP Secretary: Wang Cheng
  - Congress Chairman: Fu Zumin
  - Mayor: Shen Mingquan
  - CPPCC Chairman: Chen Long

Area
  - City: 9,816.23 km^{2} (3,790.07 sq mi)
  - Urban: 2,461.8 km^{2} (950.5 sq mi)
  - Metro: 2,461.8 km^{2} (950.5 sq mi)
- Elevation: 150 m (490 ft)

Population (2022 census)
  - City: 9,618,000
  - Density: 979.8/km^{2} (2,538/sq mi)
  - Urban: 7,585,000
  - Urban density: 3,081/km^{2} (7,980/sq mi)
  - Metro: 2,033,000
  - Metro density: 825.8/km^{2} (2,139/sq mi)

GDP (2025)
  - City: CN¥ 1,871.6 trillion US$ 274 billion
  - Per capita: CN¥ 163,911; US$ 24,369
- Time zone: UTC+8 (China Standard)
- Postal code: 315000
- Area code: 574
- ISO 3166 code: CN-ZJ-02
- Vehicle registration: 浙B
- City trees: Camphor laurel Cinnamomum camphora (L.) Sieb.
- City flowers: Camellia
- Website: ningbo.gov.cn

Ningbo
- "Ningbo" in Simplified (top) and Traditional (bottom) Chinese characters
- Simplified Chinese: 宁波
- Traditional Chinese: 寧波
- Wu: Nihng-bo (locally)
- Literal meaning: "Tranquil Waves"
Transcriptions
Standard Mandarin
- Hanyu Pinyin: Níngbō
- Gwoyeu Romatzyh: Ningbo
- Wade–Giles: Ning^{2}-po^{1}
- IPA: [nǐŋ.pwó]
Wu
- Romanization: Nihng-bo (locally)
Hakka
- Romanization: Nèn-pô
Yue: Cantonese
- Yale Romanization: Nìhng-bō
- Jyutping: Ning^{4}-bo^{1}
- IPA: [nɪŋ˩.pɔ˥]
Southern Min
- Tâi-lô: Lîng-pho

Ningbo (Note: Chinese: 宁波; pinyin: Níngbō; Ningbo dialect: gnin² poq⁷ [ɲìɲ.póʔ], Standard Mandarin pronunciation: [nǐŋ pwó]), formerly romanized as Ningpo) is a sub-provincial city in the northeast of Zhejiang, People's Republic of China. It comprises six urban districts, two satellite county-level cities, and two rural counties, including several islands in Hangzhou Bay and the East China Sea. Ningbo is the southern economic center of the Yangtze Delta megalopolis, which includes Shanghai among other cities. The port of Ningbo–Zhoushan, spread across several locations, is the world's busiest port by cargo tonnage and the world's third-busiest container port since 2010.

Ningbo is the core city and center of the Ningbo Metropolitan Area. To the north, Hangzhou Bay separates Ningbo from Shanghai; to the east lies Zhoushan in the East China Sea; on the west and south, Ningbo borders Shaoxing and Taizhou respectively. As of the 2020 Chinese national census, the entire administrated area of Ningbo City had a population of 9.4 million (9,404,283).

Ningbo is one of the 15 sub-provincial cities in China, and is one of the five separate state-planning cities in China (the other four being Dalian, Qingdao, Xiamen, and Shenzhen), with the municipality possessing a separate state-planning status in many economic departments, rather than being governed by Zhejiang Province. Therefore, Ningbo has provincial-level autonomy in making economic and financial policies.

In 2022, the GDP of Ningbo was CNY 1570,43 billion (US$233.479 billion), and it was ranked 12th among 293 cities in China. Moreover, Ningbo is among the wealthiest cities in China; it ranked 8th in terms of average yearly disposable income in the year of 2020. As of 2020, Ningbo has global headquarters and registered offices of over 100 listed companies, and many regional business headquarters. In 2021, Ningbo featured the seventh most listed companies of all cities in China. Furthermore, Ningbo was among the top 10 Chinese cities in the Urban Business Environment Report released by the Chinese state media China Central Television (CCTV) in 2019.

As a city with rich culture and a long history dating back to the Jingtou Mountain Culture in 6300 BCE and the Hemudu culture in 4800 BCE, Ningbo was awarded "City of Culture in East Asia" by the governments of China, Japan, and Korea in 2016. From 1842, Ningbo was one of the first five treaty ports opened up to the West. Ningbo is one of the top 100 cities in the world by scientific research as tracked by the Nature Index.

== Etymology ==
The first character in the city's name ning (宁 or 寧) means "serene", while its second character bo (波) translates to "wave". The city is abbreviated "甬" (pinyin: Yǒng) for the eponymous "Yong Hill" (甬山), a prominent coastal hill near the city, and the Yong River that flows through Ningbo city.

Formerly known as Mingzhou (明州; Míngzhōu), Ningbo boasts a rich historical background. The name Mingzhou is derived from the characters "明" (Míng), which symbolizes the presence of two lakes within the city walls: the Sun Lake (日湖) and the Moon Lake (月湖). This nomenclature traces its roots back to the Tang dynasty in 636 CE. While the original Sun Lake dried up during the 19th century, the Ningbo government embarked on its restoration in 2002.

== History ==
Ningbo is one of China's oldest cities, with a history dating back to the Jingtou Mountain Culture in 6300 BCE and Hemudu culture in 4800 BCE. Ningbo was known as a trade city on the Silk Road at least two thousand years ago, and later as a major port for foreign trade. According to Erik Zürcher, among the nineteen Ashokan stupas in China, those at Changgan Temple in Nanjing and Ayuwang (Ashoka) Temple near Ningbo were particularly venerated, highlighting their importance in the early spread of Buddhism in China.

=== Ancient to Sui dynasty ===
As of 2020, the earliest relics of human activity discovered in Ningbo City are from the Jingtou Mountain site in Yuyao. These relics date back to 6300 BCE, evidencing early human consumption of seafood and rice. A large number of cultivated rice, farming tools, remains of dry-fence buildings, remains of domestic livestock, and primitive religious items have been unearthed from related sites of the Hemudu culture (5000–4500 BCE), evidencing human settlement and culture in the eastern part of the Ningshao Plain, where modern-day Ningbo city is located.

Before the Han dynasty, the area where Ningbo City is located today was sparsely populated. In the Xia dynasty, the location of Ningbo was called "Yin". In the Spring and Autumn period, the area where Ningbo to which Ningbo belonged was the Yue State. At that time, the Yue King Goujian built Juzhang City in the present-day Cicheng Town, which became the earliest city in Ningbo. In the latter half of the Warring States period, the area of Ningbo became the jurisdiction of Chu State. In 221 BCE, Qin unified the six states and the Ningbo area was delegated to Kuaiji Commandery, with three counties of Yin, Yin, and Juzhang (some studies assert there were four counties: Yin, Yin, Juzhang, and Yuyao). In the early years of the Western Han dynasty, Kuaiji Commandery belonged to the Kingdom of Jing and Wu. After the Seven Kingdoms was settled, Kuaiji Commandery was restored. In 589 CE (Sui Kai Huang nine years), the counties were merged under the Wu kingdom.

=== Tang and Song dynasty ===
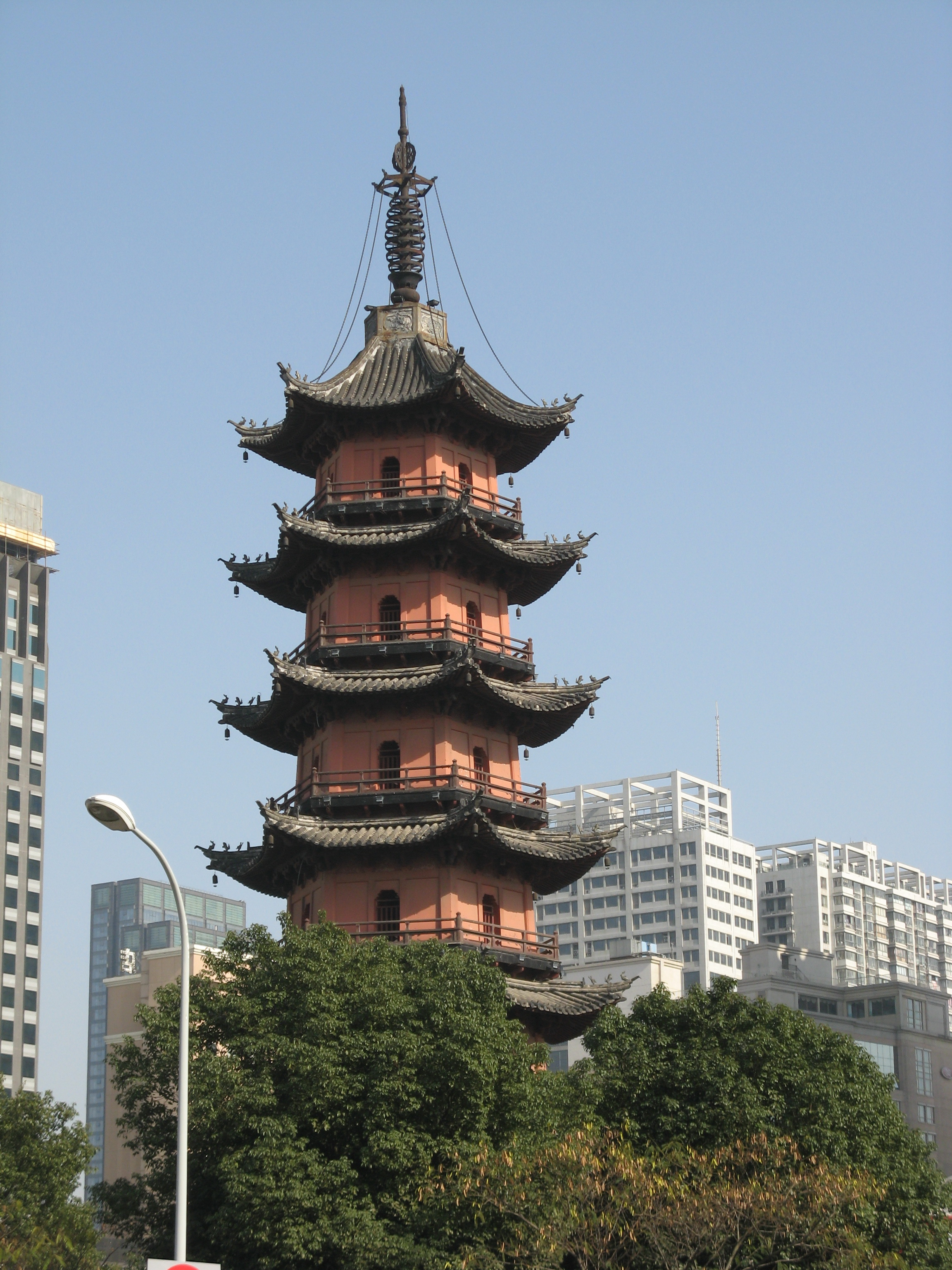
Tianfeng Tower, originally built during the Tang dynasty, is the symbol of old Ningbo.

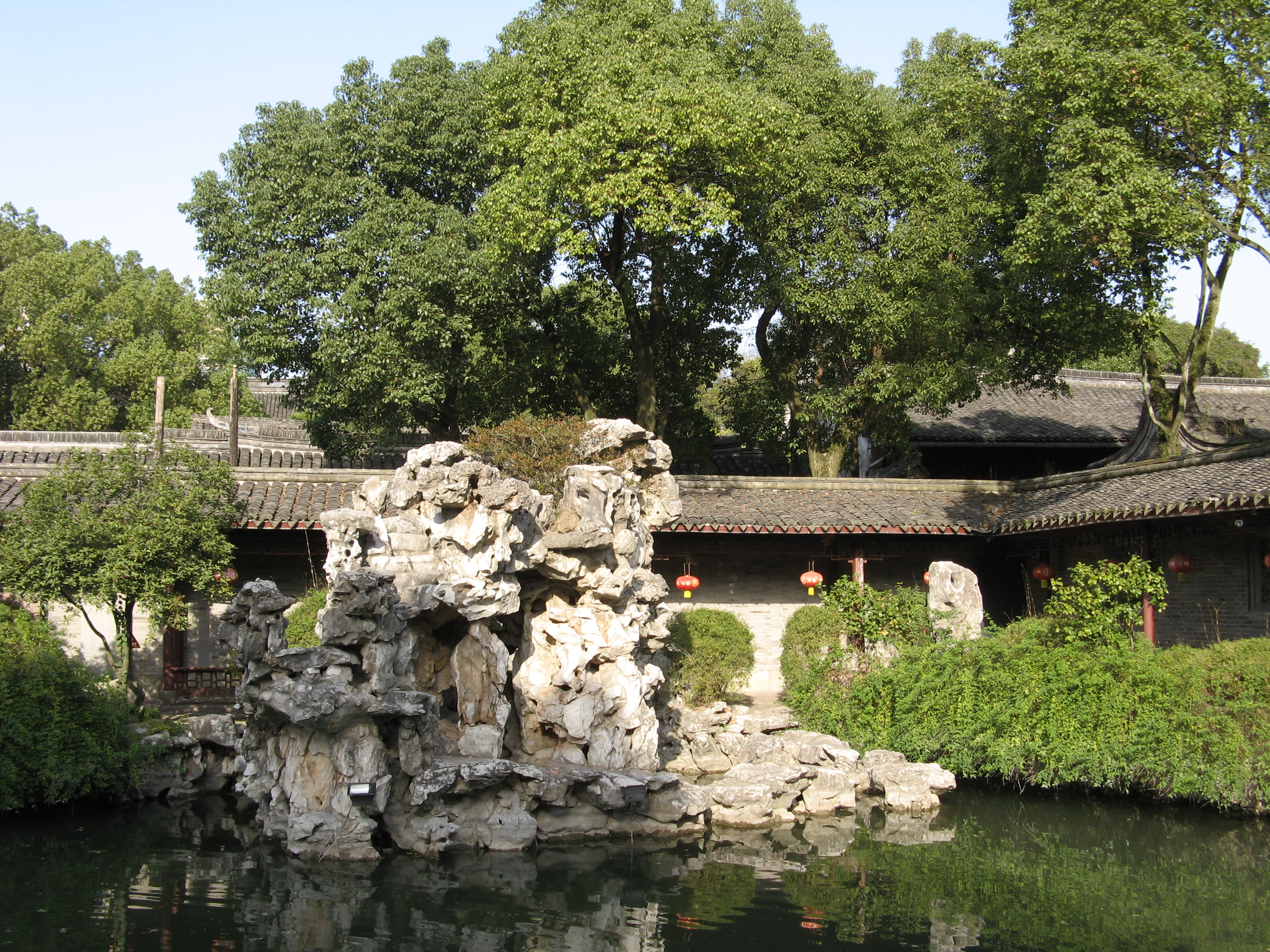
A rock garden inside Tianyi Chamber.

Since the Tang dynasty, Ningbo has been an important commercial port. Arab traders lived in Ningbo during the Song dynasty when it was known as Mingzhou or Siming, since the ocean-going trade passages took precedence over land trade during this time. It was a well known center of ocean-going commerce with the foreign world. These merchants did not intermingle with native Chinese, instead practicing their own customs and religion and inhabiting ghettos. They did not try to proselytize Islam to the Chinese. There was also a large Jewish community in Ningbo, as evidenced by the fact that, after a major flood destroyed Torah scrolls in Kaifeng in 1642, a replacement was sent to the Kaifeng Jews by the Jews at Ningbo.

From the Tang to the late Ming dynasty, the ports of Ningbo and Hangzhou saw the most direct trade between China and Japan.

=== Ming dynasty ===
The city of Ningbo was known in Europe for a long time under the name of Liampó. This was the usual spelling used, for example in the standard Portuguese history, João de Barros's Décadas da Ásia, although Barros explained that Liampó was a Portuguese "corruption" of the more correct Nimpó. The spelling Liampó is also attested to in the Peregrination (Peregrinação) by Fernão Mendes Pinto, a (so-called) autobiography written in Portuguese during the 16th century. For the mid-16th-century Portuguese, the nearby promontory, which they called the cape of Liampó after the nearby "illustrious city", was the easternmost known point of the mainland Asia. The Portuguese began trading in Ningbo around 1522. By 1542, the Portuguese had a sizable community in Ningbo (or, more likely, on nearby small islands such as Shuangyu). Portuguese activities from their Ningbo base included pillaging and attacking multiple Chinese port cities around Ningbo. They also enslaved people during their raids. The Portuguese were ousted from the Ningbo area in 1548.

In May 1523, a brawl between trade representatives from rival Japanese clans escalated into pillaging and piracy, an event known as the Ningbo incident.

=== Qing dynasty ===
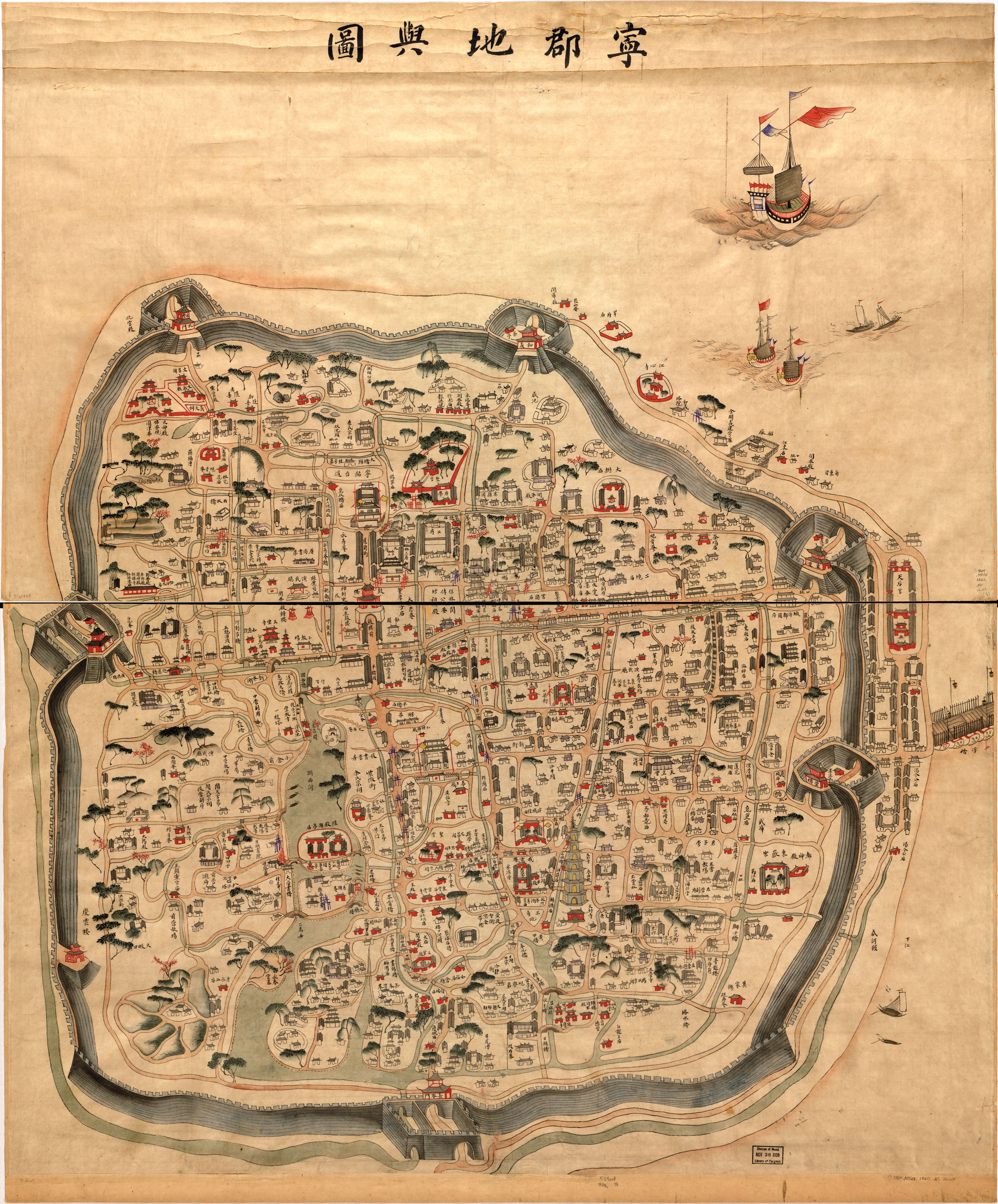
19th century map of Ningbo.

Ningbo was one of the five Chinese treaty ports opened by the Treaty of Nanjing signed in 1842 at the end of the First Opium War between the United Kingdom of Great Britain and Ireland and China. During the war, British forces briefly took possession of the walled city of Ningbo after storming the fortified town of Zhenhai at the mouth of the Yong River on October 10, 1841. The British subsequently repulsed a Chinese attempt to retake the city in the Battle of Ningpo on 10 March 1842. In 1861, the forces of the Taiping Kingdom took the city relatively unopposed as the defending garrison and all Ningbo residents fled except for the Jews and Persians; they held the town for six months. In March 1885, during the Sino-French War, Admiral Courbet's naval squadron blockaded several Chinese warships in Zhenhai Bay and exchanged fire with the shore defenses.

Ningbo was also once famed for traditional Chinese furniture production, and western encyclopedias described Ningbo as a center of craftsmanship and industry.

During the 19th century Ningbo authorities contracted Cantonese pirates to exterminate Portuguese pirates who had raided Canton shipping around Ningbo. The massacre was "successful", with 40 Portuguese dead and only 2 Cantonese dead. It was dubbed "The Ningpo Massacre" by an English correspondent, who noted that the Portuguese pirates had behaved savagely towards the Cantonese Chinese, and that the Portuguese authorities at Macau should have reined in the pirates.

During the late Qing era, Western missionaries set up a Presbyterian Church in Ningbo. Li Veng-eing was a Reverend of the Ningpo Church. The Ningpo College was managed by Rev. Robert F. Fitch. The four trustees were natives of Ningbo, and three of them had Taotai rank. Rev. George Evans Moule, B.A., was appointed as a missionary to China by the Church of England Missionary Society, and arrived at Ningpo with Mrs. Moule in February 1858. His time was chiefly divided between Ningpo and another mission station he began at Hang-chow. He wrote Christian publications in the Ningbo dialect.

=== World War II ===
During World War II in 1940, between 80% and 90% of Ningbo's population fled Ningbo, leaving primarily the elderly behind. The Japanese bombed Ningbo with ceramic bombs full of fleas carrying bubonic plague. An outbreak of bubonic plague followed. Bacteriologist Huang Ketai reported that at least 109 people died from the plague in Ningbo in November and December 1940. According to Daniel Barenblatt, imperial planes loading germ bombs for bubonic dissemination over Ningbo were recorded on film in 1940.

== Geography ==
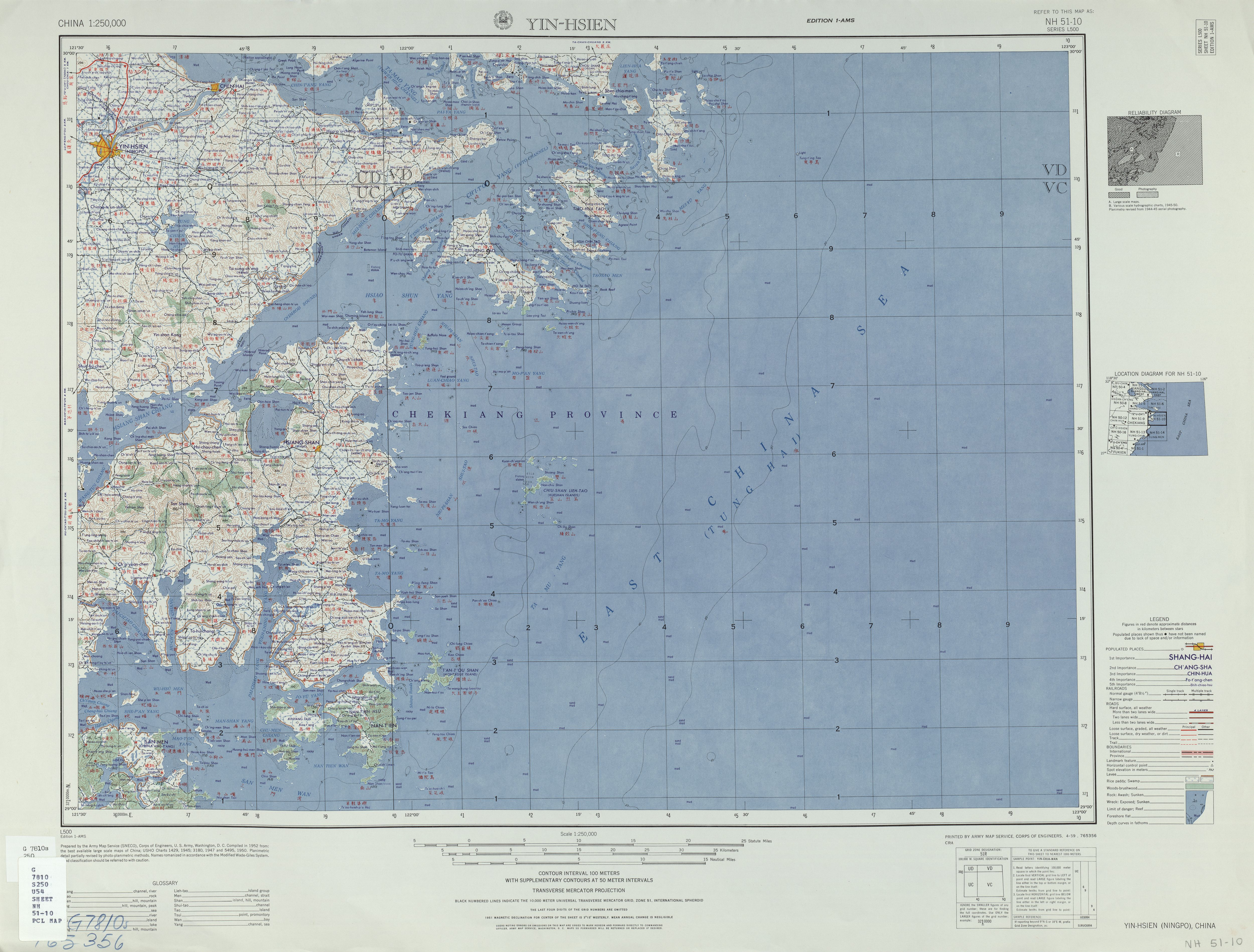
Ningpo (labeled YIN-HSIEN (NINGPO) 鄞縣) (1952)

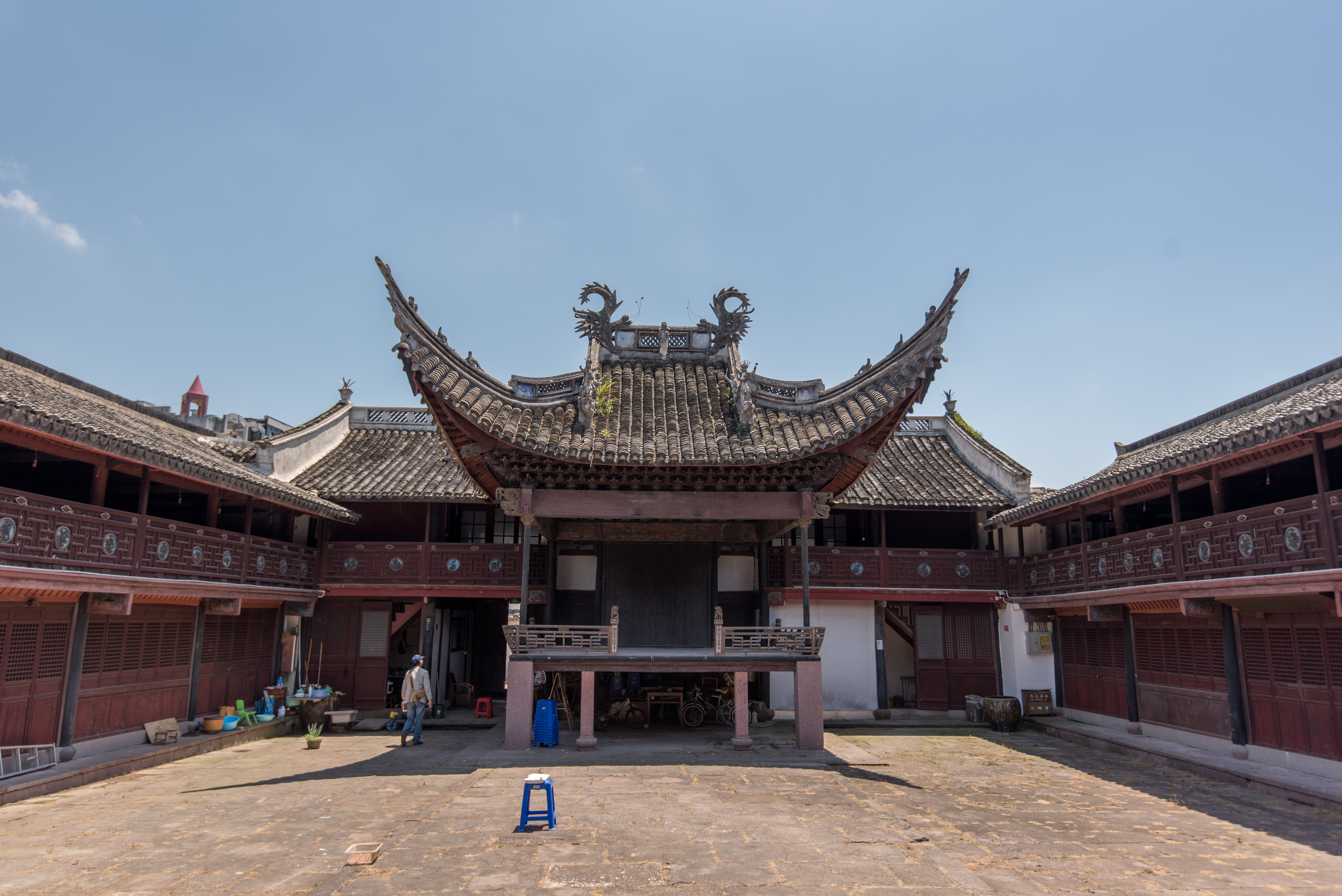
Ningbo city temple

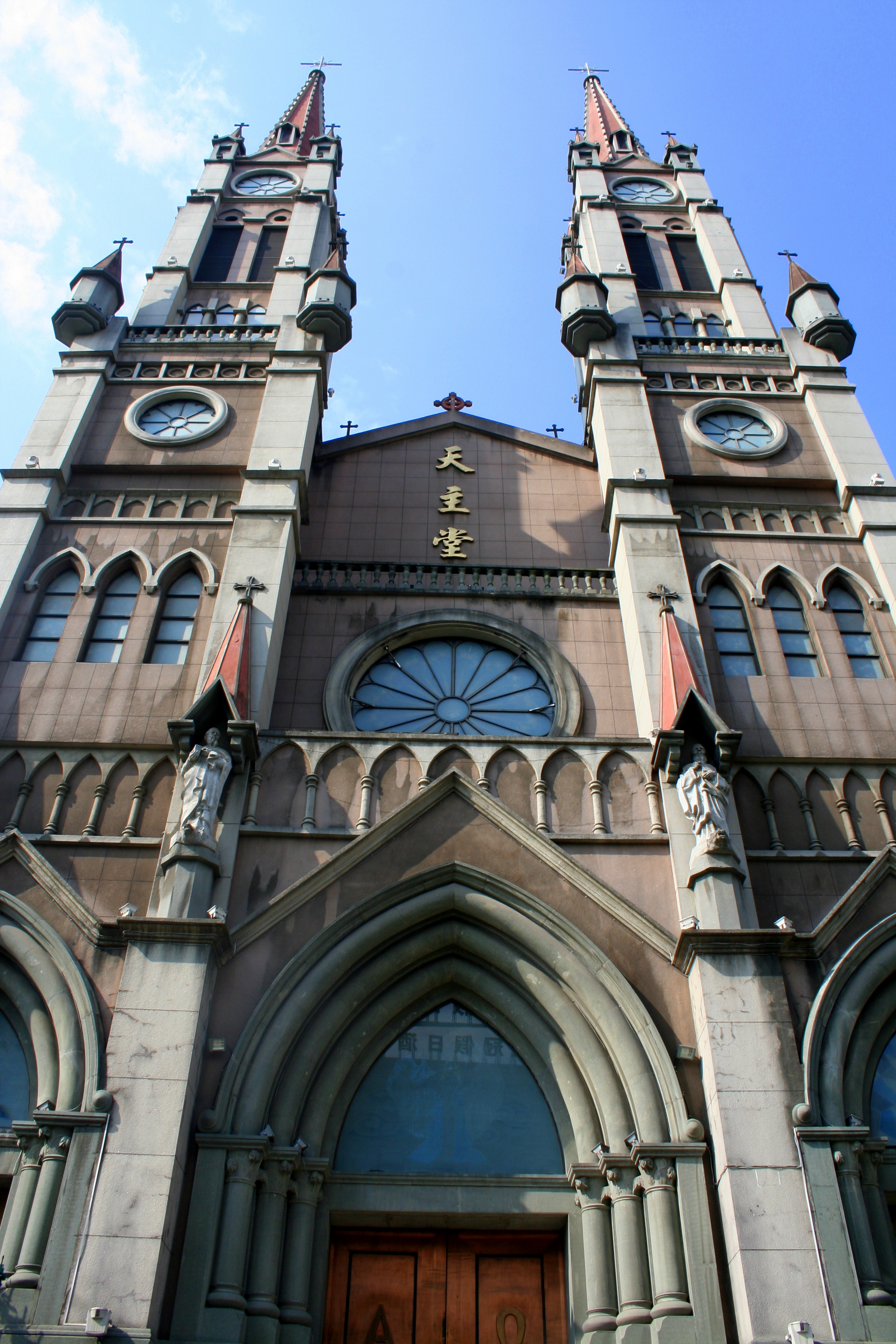
The Cathedral of the Sacred Heart of Jesus was built between 1872 and 1876, was closed by the government in 1963, and was reopened and renamed in 1980. It was recognized as a national heritage site in 2006.

Ningbo ranges in latitude from 28° 51' to 30° 33' N and in longitude from 120° 55' to 122° 16' E, bounded on the east by the East China Sea and Zhoushan Archipelago; on the north by Hangzhou Bay, across which it faces Jiaxing and Shanghai; on the west by Shaoxing; and on the south by Taizhou. Its land area is 9,816 square kilometers (3,790 sq mi), while its oceanic territory amounts to 9,758 km^{2} (3,768 sq mi); there is a total 1,562 km (971 mi) of coastline, including 788 km (490 mi) of mainland coastline and 774 km (481 mi) of island coastline that together accounting for one-third of the entire provincial coastline. There are 531 islands accounting for 524 km^{2} (202 sq mi) under the city's administration.

Ningbo's city proper is sandwiched between the ocean and low-lying mountains to the southwest, with coastal plain and valleys in between. Its central business district is bisected by the Yongjiang River. Important peninsulas include the Chuanshan Peninsula (穿山半岛), located in Beilun District and containing mainland Zhejiang's easternmost point, and the Xiangshan Peninsula (象山半岛) in Xiangshan County. The Siming Mountains (四明山) run north from Mount Tiantai and within Ningbo City, traversing Yuyao City, Haishu District, and Fenghua District, and reaching a height of 979 m (3,212 ft).

Tidal flat ecosystems occur adjacent to the city, however, large areas have been reclaimed for agricultural purposes.

=== Climate ===
Ningbo has a humid subtropical climate (Köppen Cfa) with four distinctive seasons, characterized by hot, humid summers and chilly, cloudy and dry winters (with occasional snow). The mean annual temperature is 17.6 °C (63.7 °F), with monthly daily averages ranging from 5.8 °C (42.4 °F) in January to 29.1 °C (84.4 °F) in July. Extremes since 1951 have ranged from −8.8 °C (16 °F) on 12 January 1955 to 42.1 °C (108 °F) on 8 August 2013. The city receives an average annual rainfall of 1,430 mm (56 in) and is affected by the plum rains of the Asian monsoon in June, when average relative humidity also peaks. From August to October, Ningbo experiences the effects of typhoons, and is affected by an average 1.8 storms annually, though the city is not often struck directly by these systems. A 2012 OECD study lists Ningbo among the top 20 cities worldwide most at risk of flooding due to anthropogenic climate change.

Ningbo is among the cities in China which are implementing sponge city strategies to mitigate the impacts of climate change.

Climate data for Ningbo (Yinzhou District), elevation 6 m (20 ft), (1991–2020 normals, Extremes 1951–present)
| Month | Jan | Feb | Mar | Apr | May | Jun | Jul | Aug | Sep | Oct | Nov | Dec | Year |
|---|---|---|---|---|---|---|---|---|---|---|---|---|---|
| Record high °C (°F) | 24.4 (75.9) | 30.0 (86.0) | 34.0 (93.2) | 34.9 (94.8) | 36.3 (97.3) | 38.9 (102.0) | 41.3 (106.3) | 42.1 (107.8) | 38.8 (101.8) | 36.6 (97.9) | 31.0 (87.8) | 27.0 (80.6) | 42.1 (107.8) |
| Mean daily maximum °C (°F) | 9.6 (49.3) | 11.7 (53.1) | 15.8 (60.4) | 21.7 (71.1) | 26.2 (79.2) | 29.0 (84.2) | 33.9 (93.0) | 33.1 (91.6) | 28.8 (83.8) | 24.8 (76.6) | 18.5 (65.3) | 12.4 (54.3) | 22.1 (71.8) |
| Daily mean °C (°F) | 5.8 (42.4) | 7.5 (45.5) | 11.1 (52.0) | 16.5 (61.7) | 21.5 (70.7) | 24.9 (76.8) | 29.1 (84.4) | 28.8 (83.8) | 24.8 (76.6) | 19.7 (67.5) | 14.1 (57.4) | 8.1 (46.6) | 17.7 (63.8) |
| Mean daily minimum °C (°F) | 2.9 (37.2) | 4.3 (39.7) | 7.6 (45.7) | 12.7 (54.9) | 17.8 (64.0) | 21.8 (71.2) | 25.8 (78.4) | 25.7 (78.3) | 21.8 (71.2) | 16.3 (61.3) | 10.8 (51.4) | 4.8 (40.6) | 14.4 (57.8) |
| Record low °C (°F) | −8.8 (16.2) | −7.2 (19.0) | −3.7 (25.3) | −0.2 (31.6) | 7.4 (45.3) | 12.7 (54.9) | 18.2 (64.8) | 18.4 (65.1) | 11.0 (51.8) | 1.1 (34.0) | −3.7 (25.3) | −8.5 (16.7) | −8.8 (16.2) |
| Average precipitation mm (inches) | 83.9 (3.30) | 78.6 (3.09) | 125.2 (4.93) | 103.8 (4.09) | 118.2 (4.65) | 233.6 (9.20) | 165.9 (6.53) | 205.7 (8.10) | 176.3 (6.94) | 88.9 (3.50) | 78.7 (3.10) | 69.1 (2.72) | 1,527.9 (60.15) |
| Average precipitation days (≥ 0.1 mm) | 12.3 | 11.6 | 15 | 14 | 13.6 | 16.8 | 12.1 | 15 | 13.5 | 8.9 | 10.6 | 10.5 | 153.9 |
| Average snowy days | 2.5 | 1.9 | 0.6 | 0.1 | 0 | 0 | 0 | 0 | 0 | 0 | 0 | 0.9 | 6 |
| Average relative humidity (%) | 75 | 75 | 74 | 72 | 74 | 81 | 75 | 77 | 78 | 75 | 76 | 74 | 76 |
| Mean monthly sunshine hours | 101.5 | 103.1 | 123.2 | 149.6 | 160.7 | 120.2 | 218.6 | 202.6 | 149 | 153.3 | 112.9 | 113.8 | 1,708.5 |
| Percentage possible sunshine | 31 | 33 | 33 | 39 | 38 | 29 | 51 | 50 | 41 | 44 | 36 | 36 | 38 |
| Average ultraviolet index | 4 | 5 | 7 | 9 | 10 | 11 | 11 | 11 | 9 | 7 | 4 | 3 | 8 |
Source 1: China Meteorological Administration Weather China all-time extreme temperature All-time October high
Source 2: Weather Atlas (uv)

== Administrative divisions ==
Local officers of Ningbo

- The Secretary of Party in Ningbo is Peng Jiaxue, who is first-in-charge of the city.
- The Mayor of Ningbo is Qiu Dongyao, who is second-in command of the city, and the Vice Secretary of Party in Ningbo.

Administrative divisions of Ningbo

The sub-provincial city of Ningbo is as whole an urban group with one central group, one northern group, and one southern group.

It has direct jurisdiction over the following:

- Six districts (central group): Haishu District, Yinzhou District, Jiangbei District, Beilun District, Zhenhai District, Fenghua District
- Two county-level cities (northern group): Yuyao, Cixi
- Two counties (southern group): Xiangshan, Ninghai

Map
| Subdivision | Simplified Chinese | Pinyin | Population (2022) | Area (km^{2}) | Density | Urbanization Rate(%) |
|---|---|---|---|---|---|---|
6 Central Urban Districts
| Haishu District | 海曙区 | Hǎishǔ Qū | 1,058,000 | 595.03 | 1,748.29 | 88.1 |
| Yinzhou District | 鄞州区 | Yínzhōu Qū | 1,662,000 | 799.09 | 2,079.86 | 83.0 |
| Jiangbei District | 江北区 | Jiangbei Qū | 503,000 | 208.14 | 2,416.64 | 84.7 |
| Beilun District | 北仑区 | Běilún Qū | 879,000 | 597.76 | 1,470.48 | 77.8 |
| Zhenhai District | 镇海区 | Zhènhǎi Qū | 516,000 | 244.28 | 2,112.33 | 91.1 |
| Fenghua District | 奉化区 | Fènghuà Qū | 586,000 | 1,267.60 | 462.29 | 61.2 |
2 Southern Counties
| Xiangshan County | 象山县 | Xiàngshān Xiàn | 576,000 | 1,382.18 | 416.73 | 62.5 |
| Ninghai County | 宁海县 | Nínghǎi Xiàn | 709,000 | 1,843.26 | 384.64 | 63.7 |
2 Northern County-Level Cities
| Yuyao | 余姚市 | Yúyáo Shì | 1,264,000 | 1,500.80 | 842.21 | 81.4 |
| Cixi | 慈溪市 | Cíxī Shì | 1,865,000 | 1,360.63 | 1,370.68 | 80.1 |
| Sum | | | 9,618,000 | 9,816.23 | 979.80 | 78.9 |

- Defunct: Jiangdong District

== Economy ==
Skyline of Ningbo's Central Business District

Ningbo is an important port city located 220 kilometers (140 mi) south of Shanghai. The city's export industry dates back to the 7th century. Today, Ningbo is a major exporter of electrical products, textiles, food, and industrial tools. The city's private sector is especially well-developed, contributing 80 percent of total GDP in 2013.

Historically, Ningbo was somewhat geographically isolated from other major cities. In 2007 the Hangzhou Bay Bridge was built, cutting highway transit time between Ningbo and Shanghai from four hours to two and a half. The city now serves as the economic center for the southern Yangtze River Delta and has been ranked among the most competitive cities in China.

In 2009, Ningbo's economic activity reached US$60.8 billion, down 10.4 percent from 2008. The exports totaled US$38.65 billion, down 16.6 percent from the previous year. In addition, Ningbo imported US$22.16 billion of goods, up 3.1 percent from the previous year.

Ningbo's economy grew 9.26 percent in 2013 to 712.89 billion yuan (US$115.12 billion). In 2009, the city's per capita output was US$10,833, about three times the national average.

=== Foreign investment ===
With several important development zones established in or around Ningbo, the city has received considerable foreign investment. Over 60 domestic and foreign-invested financial institutions have established operations in the city, which has also attracted more than 10,000 foreigners. The municipal government offers preferential policies designed to encourage investment in international trade, new strategic industries, manufacturing, information services, and creative industries.

=== Economic and technological development zones ===
==== Ningbo Economic & Technological Development Zone ====
Located in the north-east of Ningbo, behind Beilun Port, the Ningbo Economic and Technological Development zone is 27 km (17 mi) away from the city center. For 20 years, the Ningbo Economic and Technological Development zone has formed the general framework for large scale construction and development, and established an investment environment. It is situated close to the Ningbo Port and Ningbo Lishe International Airport. Investors include ExxonMobil, Dupont and Dow Chemical.

==== Ningbo Daxie Development Zone ====
The Ningbo Daxie Development Zone was approved in 1993 and covers an area of 5.92 km^{2} (2.29 sq mi). Over more than ten years of development and construction, industrial and logistical foundations have been established in the zone for the transshipment of energy, liquid chemicals and containers.

==== Ningbo National Hi-Tech Industrial Development Zone ====
Ningbo National Hi-Tech Industrial Development Zone was founded in 1999 and was upgraded to a national level zone in January 2007. It is 10 km (6.2 mi) from Ningbo International Airport and 18 km (11 mi) away from Ningbo Port. The zone serves as the important technical innovation base of Yangtze River Delta. Industries encouraged include chemicals production and processing, biotechnology and pharmaceuticals, raw material processing, Research and Development.

==== Ningbo Free Trade Zone ====
Ningbo Free Trade Zone is one of the 15 free trade zones authorized by the State Council of China and is the only free trade zone in Zhejiang Province. It was established by State Council in 1992, covering the area of 2.3 km^{2} (0.89 sq mi). It lies in the middle of the coastline of mainland China, at the south of Yangtze River Delta. In 2008, its industrial output value was RMB 53.33 billion and grew at 19.8 percent as compared to 2007.

==== Nordic Industrial Park ====
The Nordic Industrial Park Co. Ltd. (NIP) is one of the first wholly foreign-owned industrial parks in China located in Ningbo, Zhejiang Province. NIP is managed and operated by a Scandinavian management team.

==== Ningbo Advertising Park ====
The Ningbo Advertising Park is a national level pilot park located in the Ningbo Southern Business District. The financial incentives have attracted over 300 relevant firms to establish operations.

== Ningbo port ==
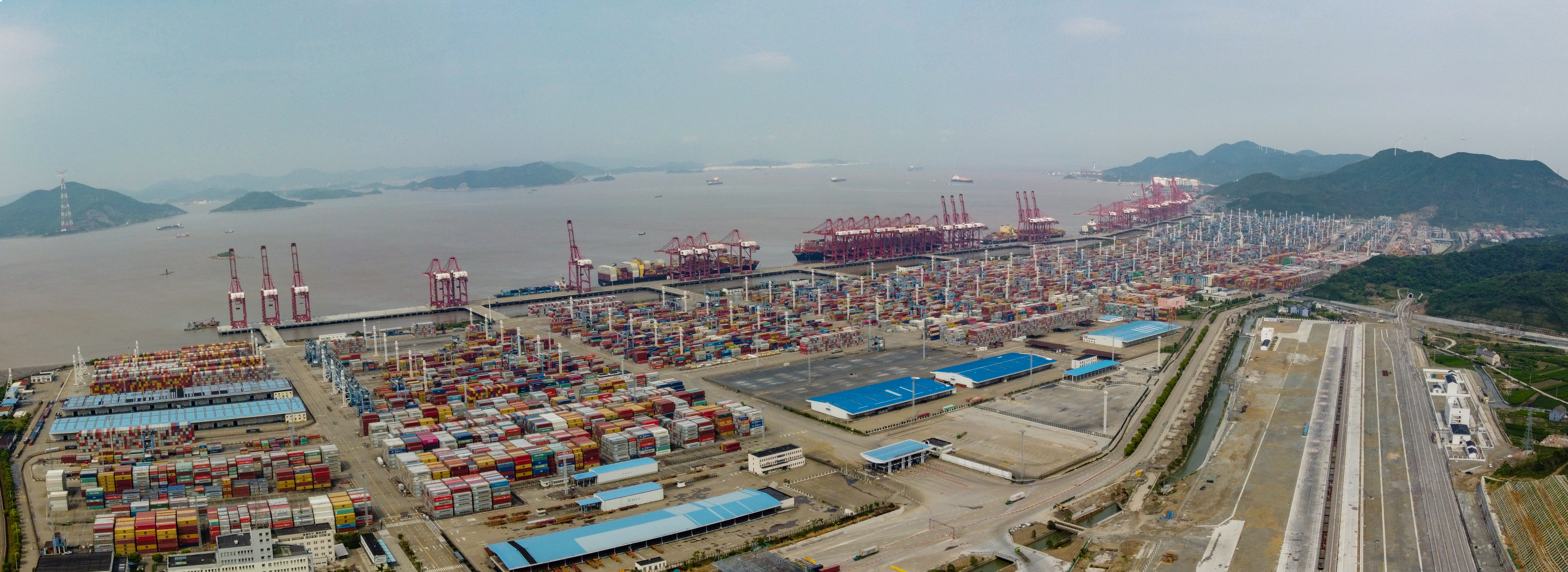
Ningbo port in the Beilun District

Unlike other Chinese cities, Ningbo has the same authority as provincial governments for economic administration and is the largest port in the world in terms of annual cargo throughput. In contrast to Shanghai, the port is deepwater and capable of handling 300,000-ton vessels. The port is located mainly in Beilun District and Zhenhai District.

In 2006, Ningbo Port started its expansion towards the neighboring island city of Zhoushan to build an even larger port with higher capacity to compete with neighboring ports in the region, such as Shanghai's Yangshan a deepwater port. Statistics in 2010 showed that total cargo throughput was 627,000,000 tons and container throughput was 13,144,000 TEUs. In 2021, total cargo throughput was 1,224,050,000 tons, including 31,080,000 TEUs. Ningbo proper saw 623,400,000 tons and 29,370,000 TEUs, while Zhoushan saw 600,650,000 tons and 1,710 000 TEUs.

With bulk container breakdowns, improved logistics, and chemical and foodstuff processing developments, Ningbo operates as a major east coast port in China alongside Shanghai.

Ningbo is part of the 21st Century Maritime Silk Road that runs from the Chinese coast to the south, via Singapore towards the southern tip of India, via Mombasa to the Mediterranean, and from there via Athens to the Upper Adriatic region, to the northern Italian hub of Trieste, with its rail connections to Central Europe and Eastern Europe.

== Tourism ==
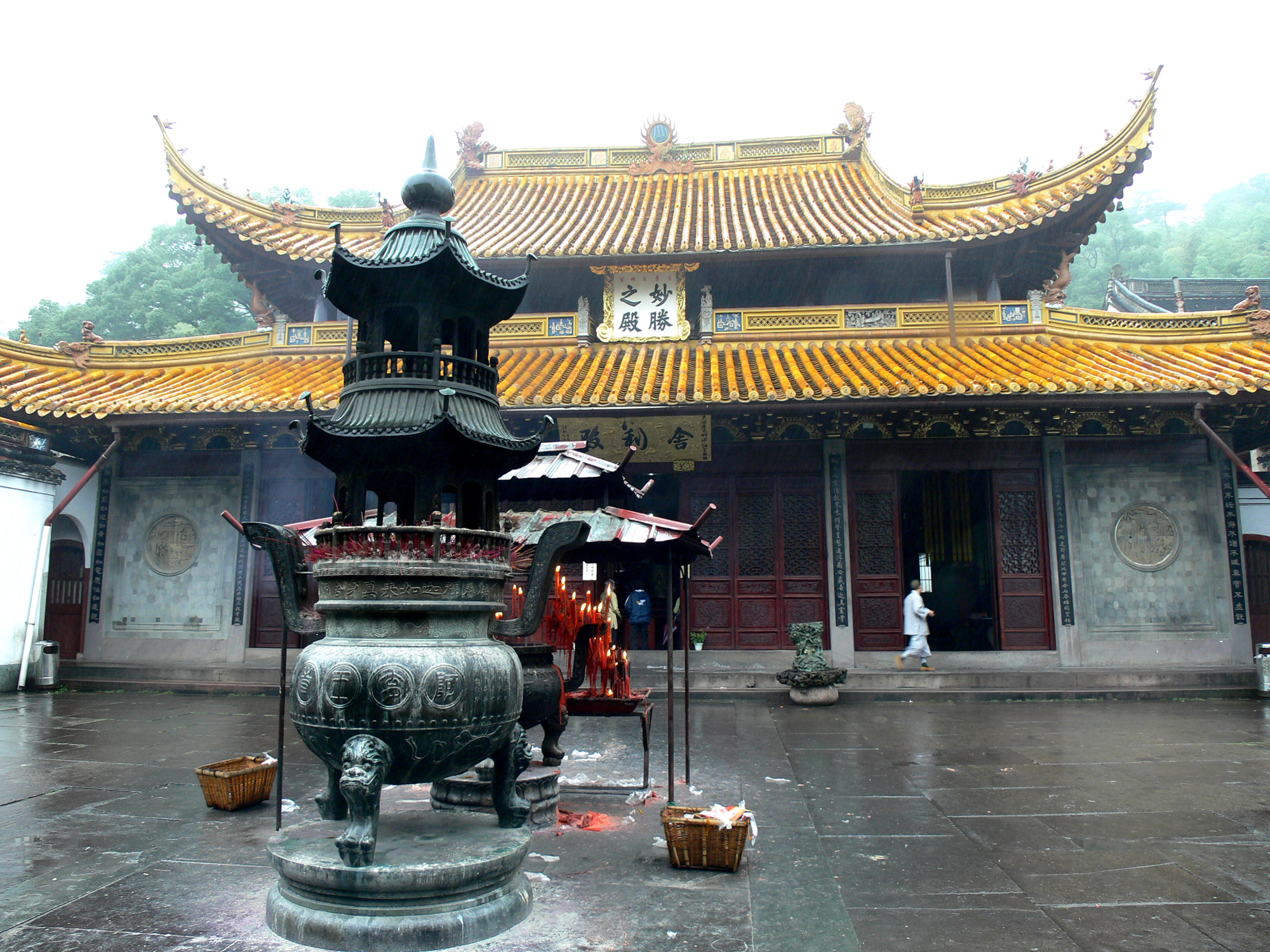
King Ashoka Temple

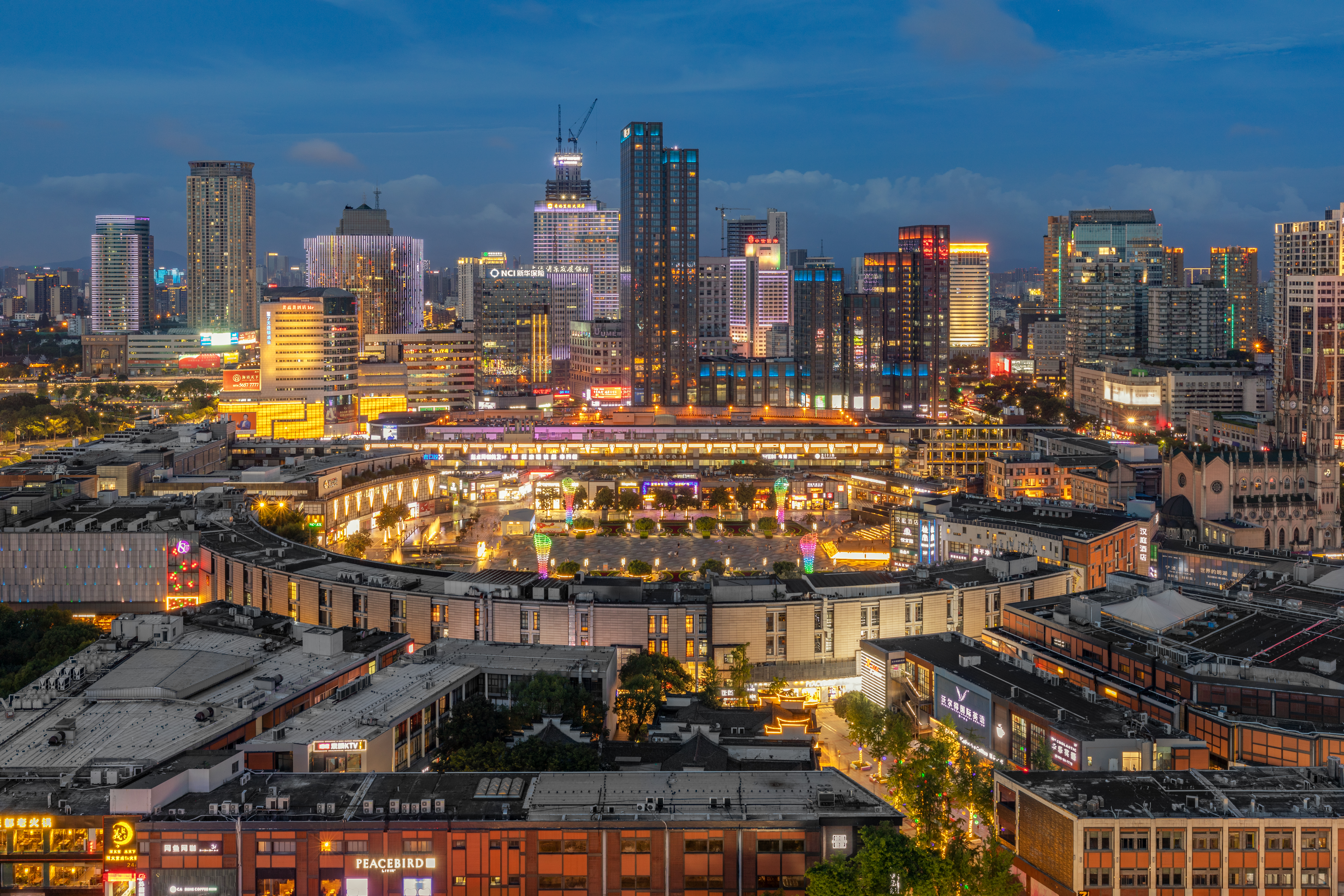
Haishu District, Tianyi Square

Due to its long history and economic prosperity, Ningbo is a city with very rich tourist resources. The following is a list of the main tourist attractions authorized by the Ningbo Municipal Bureau of Culture, Radio, Television and Tourism in each subdivision of Ningbo city.

=== Haishu District ===
- Moon Lake Park (Yuehu Park): A reservoir excavated in the Tang dynasty (636 CE) at the center of Haishu District. The park includes the lake itself, some small islands on the lake, and many ancient Chinese architectures and historical sites, such as:
  - Tianyi Pavilion (or Tianyi Chamber): One of Ningbo's most popular and famous tourist attractions. Built in 1516 CE, it is the oldest library existent in Asia and is one of the 3 oldest private libraries in the world. The collection dates back to the 11th century and includes woodblock and handwritten copies of the Confucian classics, rare local histories, and lists of the candidates successful in imperial examinations. The currently Tianyi Pavilion refers to the whole museum complex that includes:
    - Tianyi Pavilion-related buildings such as:
    - The ancient Chinese mansion of the library's first owner, Fan Qing, built during the Ming dynasty (1516 CE)
    - A traditional Chinese Garden as part of Fan's mansion
    - An ancient private theater of Chinese plays as part of Fan's mansion
    - A Mahjong (麻將) museum, since Ningbo is regarded as the birthplace of Mahjong
  - He Ancestral Temple (賀祕監祠): A cultural built in honor of the Chinese poet He Zhizhang (賀知章, 659 CE – 744 CE) during the Tang dynasty who called himself the "Siming Crazy Guest", where "Siming" is the name of a mountain in Ningbo. The building was completed during the Song dynasty (1144 CE) and repaired during the Qing dynasty (1865 CE).
  - Ancient Korean Embassy: Built during the Northern Song dynasty to welcome Korean envoys and business groups. Destroyed by war in 1130 CE, the site was announced as a cultural relics protection unit in 1984. It is now a showroom for the history of relations between Ningbo and Korea.
  - Central Lake Temple, Central Lake East Bridge, Zhenming Ridge, and Xuanmiao Temple: A Ningbo-born novelist Qu You wrote a fiction called Peony Dengji (牡丹燈記, Janpanese: Botan Dōrō also known as 怪談牡丹燈籠 Tales of the Peony Lantern) (in the collection of Jiandeng Xinhua). It describes a love story between ghost and a man during Fang Guozhen period. The story took place at the Moon Lake. Japanese scholar Koyama Issei identified many of the locations, including Central Lake Temple, Central Lake East Bridge, Zhenming Ridge, and Xuanmiao temple, that would fit geographically and architecturally of the places mentioned in the story. The story was adapted as one of three Kaidan tales in Japan.
- Drum Tower Complex (Haishu Tower): The only remaining ruin of an old city gate tower constructed during the Tang dynasty. At the top, there is a six-meter-high Romanesque bell tower added in the Republic period. Around the base of the tower is a commercial area where all the buildings are reconstructed in the traditional style.
- Chenghuang Temple (Ningbo County Temple): An ancient temple of the City God at commercial center in downtown Ningbo.
- Tianfeng Pagoda: This national cultural relics protection site is a typical Song-style loft-style brickwood structure tower unique to Jiangnan. This hexagonal building is a landmark and the tallest ancient structure in the city. It appears as a seven-story tower with another seven stories underground, and is renowned for its long history, architectural value, and ancient artifacts. The tower was first built in 695 CE during the Tang dynasty (618–907 CE).
- Tianyi Square: Located in the bustling old downtown of Ningbo City with the nationwide famous shopping complex, named after the Tianyi Ge (Chamber), the oldest private library in Asia.
- Nantang Old Street: An old commercial street by the river with many folk arts and crafts shops, souvenir stores, and small restaurants. Previously, Nantang Street was a place for local fairs and flea markets. In 2013, the street was renovated to become a tourist site.
- Liangzhu Cultural Park: A theme park dedicated to the story of the Butterfly Lovers, one of the four folklores in China. The Butterfly Lovers is reputed as the oriental version of Romeo and Juliet.
- Baiyun Manor: An ancient academy where Huang Zongxi (黃宗羲) gave lectures. Huang, whose style name is Taichong, was a distinguished thinker, writer, and historian of the late Ming and early Qing.
- Tashan Weir: An ancient dam erected during the Tang dynasty.
- Ningbo Wulongtan Scenic Scenic Resort: Also called Five-dragon Pools Scenic Resort, it is one of the Ten New Sceneries in Ningbo, and a National AAAA rated scenic area.
- Xiaowen Street:An ancient street in the old town of Haishu.It gets its name from the Song-dynasty filial son Yang Qing(杨庆).

=== Yinzhou District ===
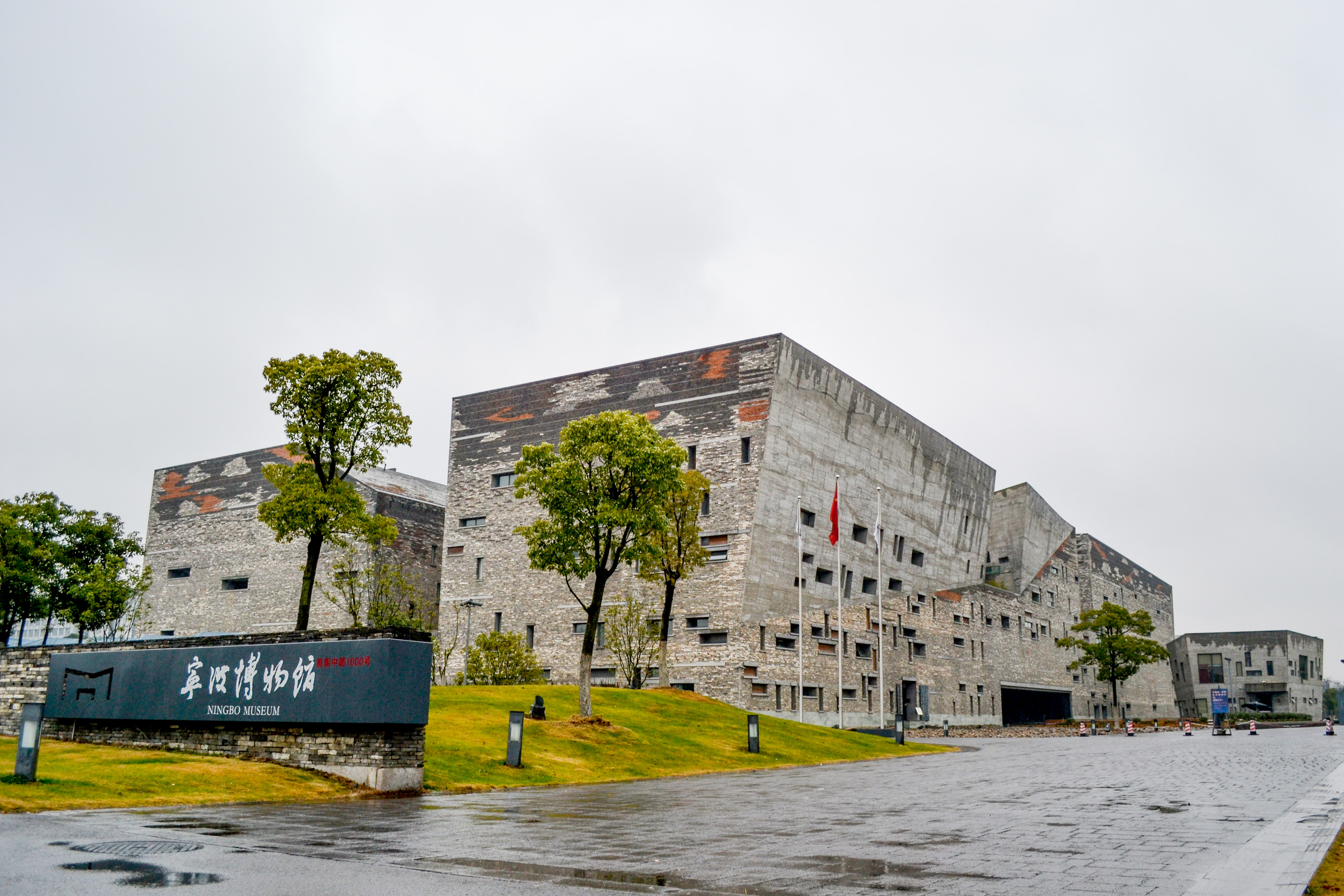
Ningbo Museum

- Ningbo Museum (Yinzhou Museum, or Ningbo Historic Museum): A museum focused on Ningbo area history and traditional customs, considered the masterwork of Wang Shu, the first Chinese citizen to win the Pritzker Architecture Prize in 2012. The Ningbo Museum is also the main filming location for the 2023 TV series adaptation of scifi author Liu Cixin's novel of the same name, Three Bodies.
- Romon U-Park: One of the largest urban indoor theme parks in the world.
- Ningbo Eastern New Town: A newly developed area of Ningbo City, with a well-designed CBD (including two 400m skyscrapers and other headquarters of many listed company and government offices), several museums, galleries, and shopping centers, including:
  - Ningbo Urban Planning Exhibition Center
  - Ningbo Hankyu Commercial Complex: Opened in 2021, it is the first overseas outlet of Hankyu, the famous Japanese department store.
  - Ningbo New Library: Located in the Eastern New Town, the New Ningbo library opened in 2018.
- Yinzhou Park and Ningbo Southern CBD
- Dongqian Lake: The largest natural freshwater lake in Zhejiang Province. The earliest historical record of the lake dates back to the West Jin dynasty, and there are several natural sceneries and historical attractions around the lake:
  - Little Putuo: An island on the lake with several temples built during the Song dynasty by a prime minister called Shihao.
  - Yuefei Temple: A temple built during the Song dynasty in memory of Yuefei.
  - Taogong Island: The place where Fanli and Xishi once lived according to folklore.
  - Southern Song Dynasty Rock Carving Park: won the "National Cultural Relics Conservation Best Project Award" awarded by the China National Architecture Research Association and the China Cultural Relics Conservation Foundation
  - Fuquan Mountain: a mountain with a Chinese tea theme park
  - Ningbo Hanling Old Street: an ancient street with a history thousands of years. It was once called Hanling City. The 'city' here means bazaar.
- Qita Temple: A Zen Buddhist temple complex first consecrated during the Tang dynasty in the downtown area of Ningbo city.
- Tianhou Temple: A former temple of Mazu as the "Empress of Heaven" once used by Fujianese merchants as their guild hall (Qing'an Huiguan). In the 19th century, it was accounted by S. Wells Williams as the most beautiful place in Ningbo and by John Thomson as one of the most beautiful temples in China, but that structure was destroyed during the Chinese Civil War. It has been reconstructed with many of its original works of art, however, to form the East Zhejiang Maritime Affairs and Folk Customs Museum.
- Temple of King Ashoka: a Buddhist temple first established during the Western Jin dynasty (282 AD).
- Tiantong Temple: One of the "Five Chan Buddhism Temples". Tiantong Temple is the cradle of the Sōtō school (曹洞宗, Sōtō-shū) of Japanese Buddhism.
- Ningbo Ocean World: An aquarium with an ocean theater
- Ningbo Wildlife Park:Formerly known as Ningbo Youngor Zoo, is a 4A-level scenic area located in the Dongqian Lake Tourist Resort.It is one of the largest wildlife parks by water area in China.
- Ningbo Sakura Park (Zhongxing Sakura Park): A sakura park built to commemorate the friendship city between Ningbo City and Nagaoka City, Japan

=== Jiangbei District ===
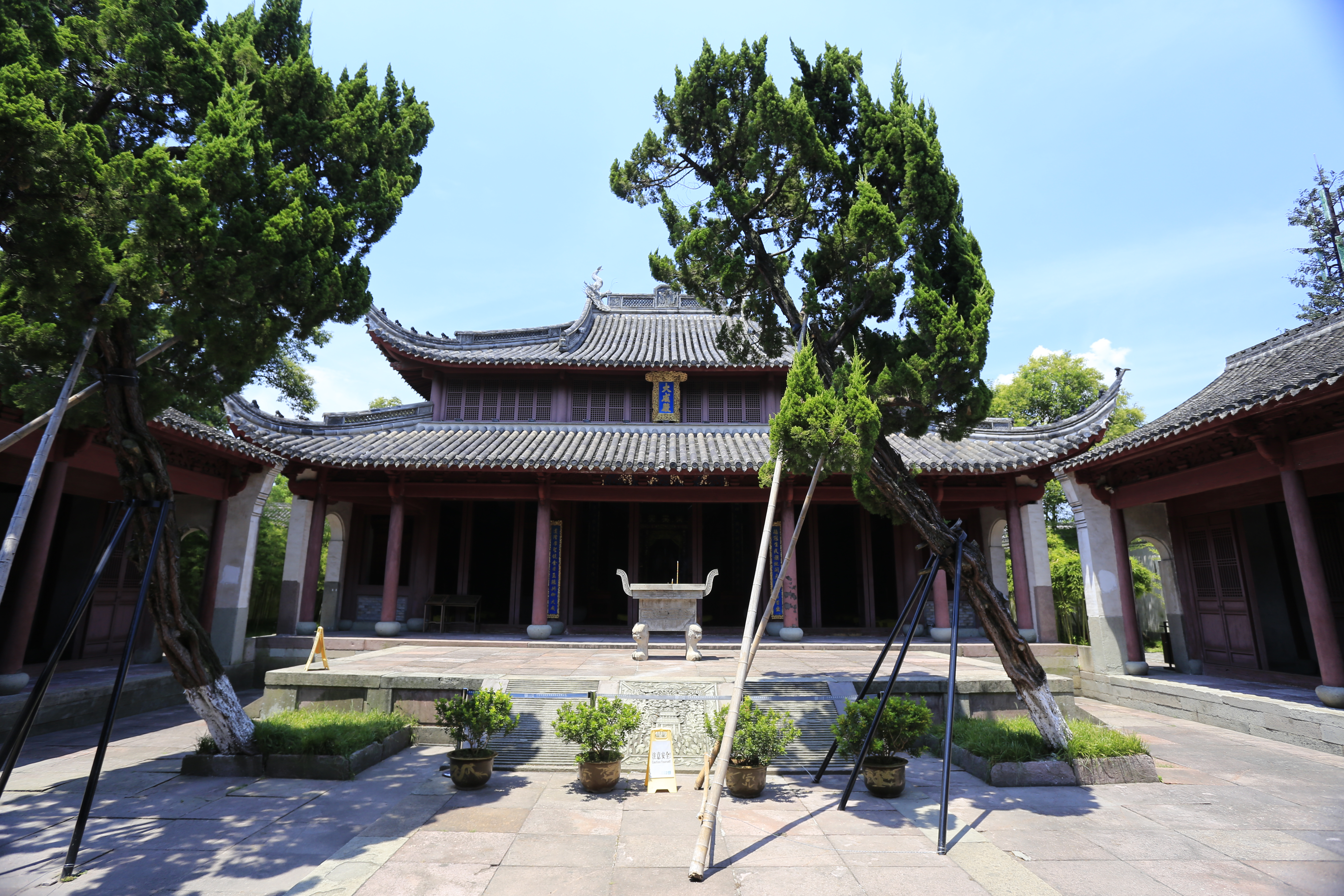
Confucian Temple of Cicheng

- Sanjiangkou: The place where the Yong River, Yaojiang River, and Fenghua River meet, and the heart of old Ningbo city where the borders of 3 urban districts of Ningbo city meet.
- Old Bund (Old Waitan): A waterfront area and protected historical district in the center of Ningbo, built earlier than the Bund of Shanghai, with lots of early 19th century architectures, stores and restaurants.
- Baoguo Temple: The oldest intact wooden structure in eastern China. It is in the first batch of National Key Cultural Relics Protection Sites in China. Currently, it is the Baoguo Temple Ancient Architecture Museum, and has become a teaching and research base for many top architectural universities.
- Ningbo Museum of Art: Designed by Wang Shu and rebuilt from an ola wharf at Sanjiangkou, is a public non-profit art venue opened in 2005.
- Ningbo Museum of Garden (寧波園林博物館):The place which is Zhejiang's first thematic garden museum, combining indoor exhibits and outdoor classical garden landscapes.
- Sacred Heart Cathedral, Ningbo: Sacred Heart Cathedral is a Gothic style Roman Catholic church and Major Historical and Cultural Site Protected at the National Level in Ningbo.
- Cicheng Ancient Town: A very well-maintained ancient Chinese ancient walled city built in the 8th century, including ancient-time schools, courts, temples, houses, commercial areas. In December 2009, the ancient buildings in Cicheng received the honorary award of the UNESCO Asia-Pacific Heritage Awards for Culture Heritage Conservation by UNESCO.
- Yaojiang Park: Was completed in 1992 and reconstructed from a nursery. It adopts plant landscaping as its primary feature and named after the adjacent Yaojiang River.

=== Zhenhai District ===
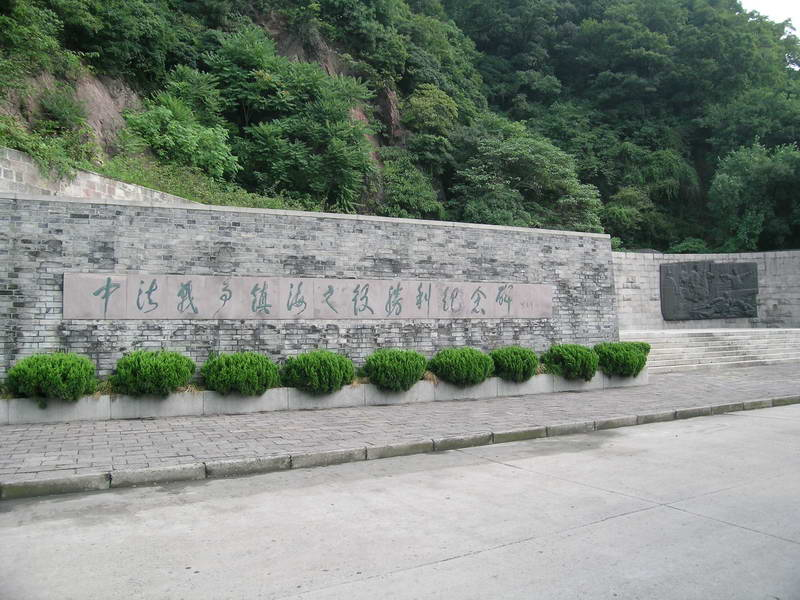
The monument to victory in the Battle of Zhenhai (Sino-French War)

- Jiulong Lake: A national 4A scenic area in Zhenhai District, was built as Shizilu Reservoir in 1977 and named after nearby Jiulong Mountain with nine peaks and ridges.
- Zhaobao Mountain: Known as the gateway of Eastern Zhejiang at the Yong River estuary, is a 4A scenic site famed for coastal defence relics and four historic resistance campaigns.
- The Seventeen Houses of Zheng's: The seventeen Houses of Zheng exemplify the classical style of residences during the Ming and Qing dynasties in the south part of Yangtze River Basin.
- Ningbo Bang Museum and Culture Park: Displays exhibits related to the Ningbo Gang (Ningbo Merchants Group), and the development history of the business gang. It was one of the ten largest commercial groups during the Ming and Qing dynasties, and became the biggest commercial regional group of China in the late Qing dynasty.
- Yugang Bao's Old House: A provincial heritage site and 3A attraction, was the birthplace of the "King of Ships"with Jiangnan-style architecture dating to the Qing Qianlong period.

=== Beilun District ===
- Port Museum of China: Opened in 2014, is China's largest port-themed museum, a national first-class museum and 4A tourist attraction.

=== Fenghua District ===
- Xuedou Temple: An ancient Chan monastery and the primary Maitreya Buddhist site, is home to the giant bronze maitreya statue.

=== Xiangshan County ===
- Yushan Islands: Formed by rocky islets and reefs, the archipelago features rich fishery resources, transparent seawater and unique coastal erosion landforms.
- Nantian Island: Boasting an area of 84.38 square kilometres, it ranks as the largest island of Ningbo, featuring mixed terrain of hills and low plains, forested landscapes and natural sandy shorelines.
- Xiangshan Global Studios: Hosting a variety of period film sets spanning multiple dynasties, it is one of China's top ten film and television bases and a national 4A-level tourist attraction, where numerous well-known Chinese dramas and films have been shot.

=== Ninghai County ===
- The Zhedong Grand Canyon: Carved by fluvial erosion with clear streams and rocky outcrops, it is celebrated for its wild, pristine mountain-and-river scenery.
- Nanxi Hot Spring: Boasting constant warm spring temperatures and abundant beneficial minerals, it integrates hot spring therapy, forest sightseeing and leisure vacation services.
- Qiantong Old Town: Crisscrossed by ancient waterways and stone alleys, it preserves well-kept Ming and Qing residences and traditional clan customs.

=== Yuyao City (County) ===
- Hemudu Culture Relics Site and Museum: The relic site and museum of a Neolithic culture that flourished just south of Hangzhou Bay.

=== Cixi City (County) ===
- Dapeng Mountain: A 4A scenic site, is famed as the legendary departure point of Xu Fu's eastern voyage in the Qin Dynasty.

== Notable people ==
People in mainland China

- Zhang Jianhong, freelance writer, playwright, poet, and democracy activist
- Pan Tianshou, an artist in Chinese painting
- Zhou Xinfang, an artist in Peking opera
- Yu Lina, a violinist
- Sha Menghai, a master calligrapher
- Pang Lijuan, an educator and politician
- Tu Youyou, a scientist awarded the Nobel Prize in Physiology or Medicine
- Sang Lan, an advocate for improved conditions for the disabled in China
- Shen Yueyue, a senior politician
- Shi Xiaolin, a politician
- Wang Xingxing, roboticist, entrepreneur and founder of Unitree Robotics

People in Hong Kong

- Run Run Shaw
- Tung Chee Hwa
- Tung Chao Yung
- Chen Din Hwa
- Stephen Chow
- Sammo Hung
- Yue-Kong Pao

People in Taiwan

- Chiang Kai-shek, former President of the Republic of China
- Chiang Ching-kuo, Chiang Kai-shek's son
- Morris Chang

People overseas

- Shien Biau Woo
- Yo Yo Ma
- Kin Yamei
- Yuan Yang (politician)

== Transportation ==
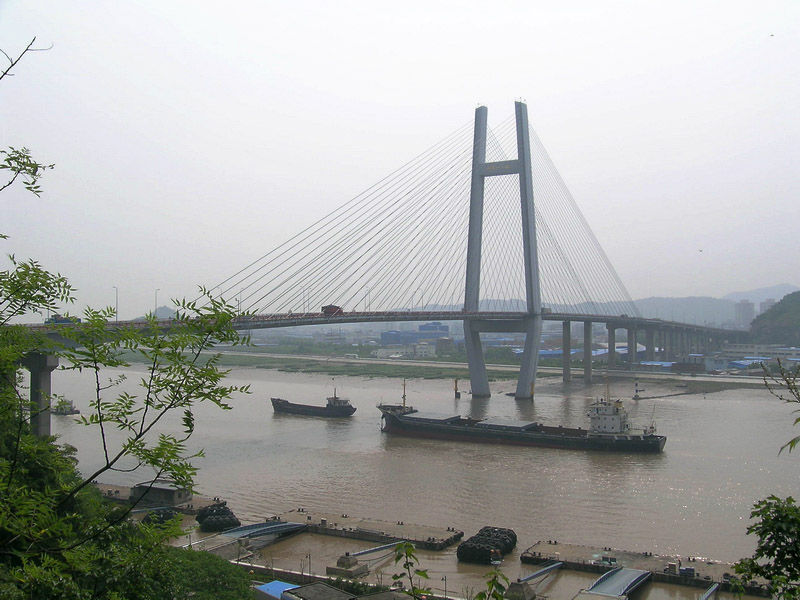
Zhao bao shan Bridge, Zhenhai District, Ningbo

=== Bridge ===
The Hangzhou Bay Bridge, a combination cable-stayed bridge and causeway across Hangzhou Bay, opened to the public on 1 May 2008. This bridge connects the municipalities of Shanghai and Ningbo and is considered the longest trans-oceanic bridge in the world. It is the world's second-longest bridge, after the Lake Pontchartrain Causeway in Louisiana, United States.

The Jintang Bridge, a four-lane sea crossing bridge linking Jintang Island of Zhoushan and Zhenhai district, is a 27 km (17 mi) long opened on December 26, 2009.

The Xiangshan Harbor Bridge opened to traffic on December 29, 2012, connecting Ningbo with Xiangshan. The 47 km (29 mi) long project includes 22 km (14 mi) as the main body of the bridge and an 8 kilometer long tunnel.

=== Sea port ===
The port of Ningbo is the world's busiest port. It was ranked number 1 in total Cargo Volume (1.22 billion tons in 2021) and number 3 in total container traffic (31.1 million TEUs in 2021) since 2019.

=== Airport ===
Ningbo Lishe International Airport connects Ningbo by air to the rest of China, with regularly scheduled domestic and international flights.

=== Railway ===
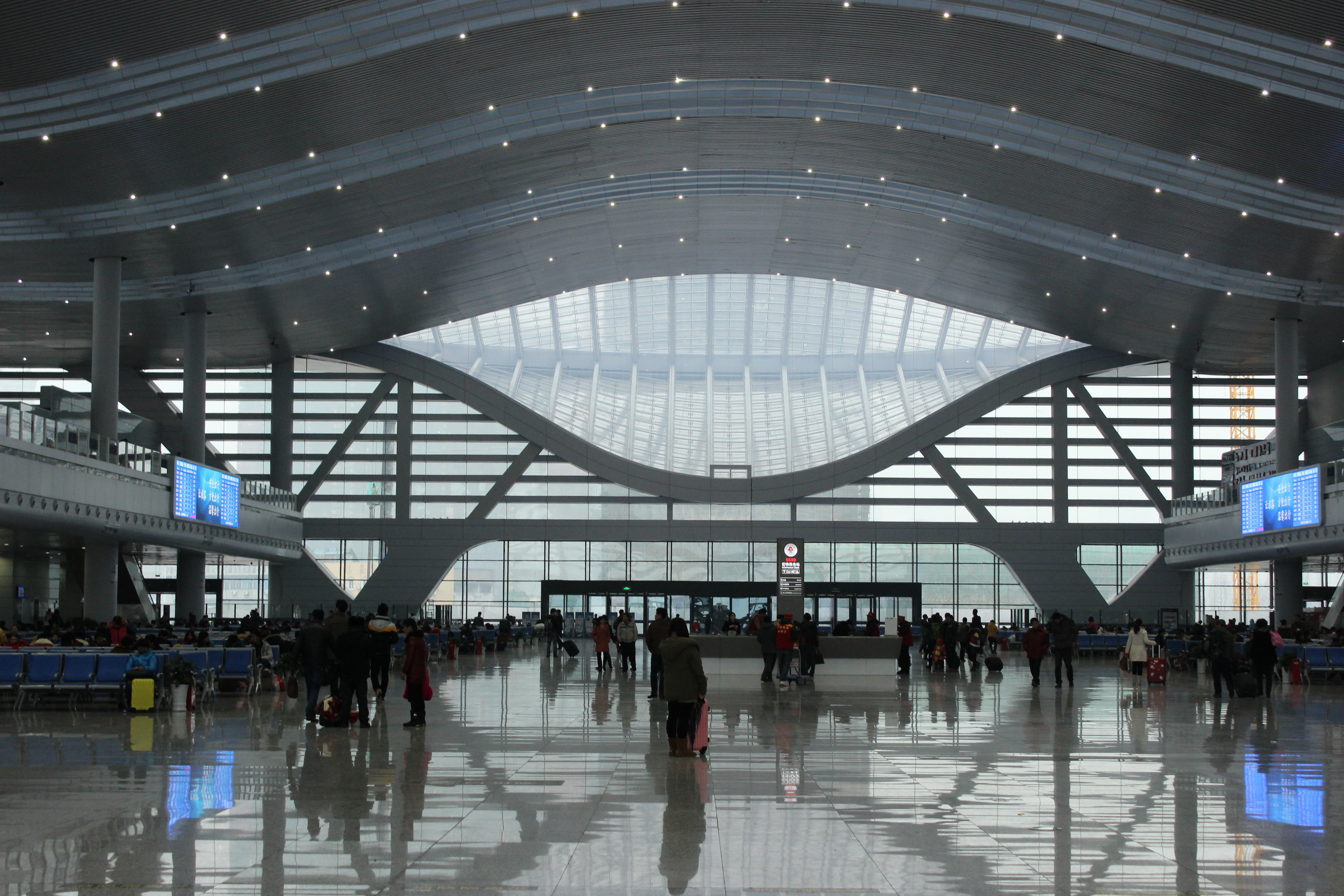
Ningbo New Railway Station was reopened in December 2013 after years of on-site restoration to accommodate high speed rails and increasing passengers

Three railway lines intersect in Ningbo: the Xiaoshan–Ningbo Railway (Xiaoyong Line), which runs west to Hangzhou; the Ningbo–Taizhou–Wenzhou (Yongtaiwen) Railway, which runs south to Wenzhou; and the Hangzhou–Ningbo High-Speed Railway, which runs parallel to the Xiaoyong Line providing high-speed railway service.

With the booming economy in the region, the Xiaoyong Railway, a conventional railway built in the 1950s, could not meet the demand for railway travel between Zhejiang's two largest cities, so construction of a new high-speed railway line between Hangzhou and Ningbo started in 2009. The new railway line was finished in 2013 and reduced travel time between Ningbo and Hangzhou to 50 minutes.

The Ningbo–Taizhou–Wenzhou Railway is a high-speed railway that opened in September 2009. It connects Ningbo with cities along the coast to the south to Fujian Province. High-speed trains on this line operate at speeds of up to 250 km/h (160 mph).

Ningbo re-opened the Ningbo railway station after three years of construction on 28 December 2013. With a construction area of more than 120,000 m2, it is one of the largest railway stations in China.

=== Expressway ===
Seven expressways connect Ningbo with its surrounding cities:

- The Hangyong expressway, built in the 1990s, connects Hangzhou and Ningbo, and is now part of Hangzhou Bay ring expressway (G9211).
- The Yongtaiwen expressway (G15), opened in 2000, connects Ningbo with Taizhou and Wenzhou.
- The Yongjin expressway (G1512) connects Ningbo and Jinhua.
- The Huyong expressway (G15) connects Ningbo and Shanghai via the Hangzhou Bay bridge.
- The Yongzhou expressway (G9211) via Jintang Bridge.
- The G1504 Ningbo Ring Expressway
- The G1523 Ningbo–Dongguan Expressway

Ningbo Rail Transit Plan (2026)

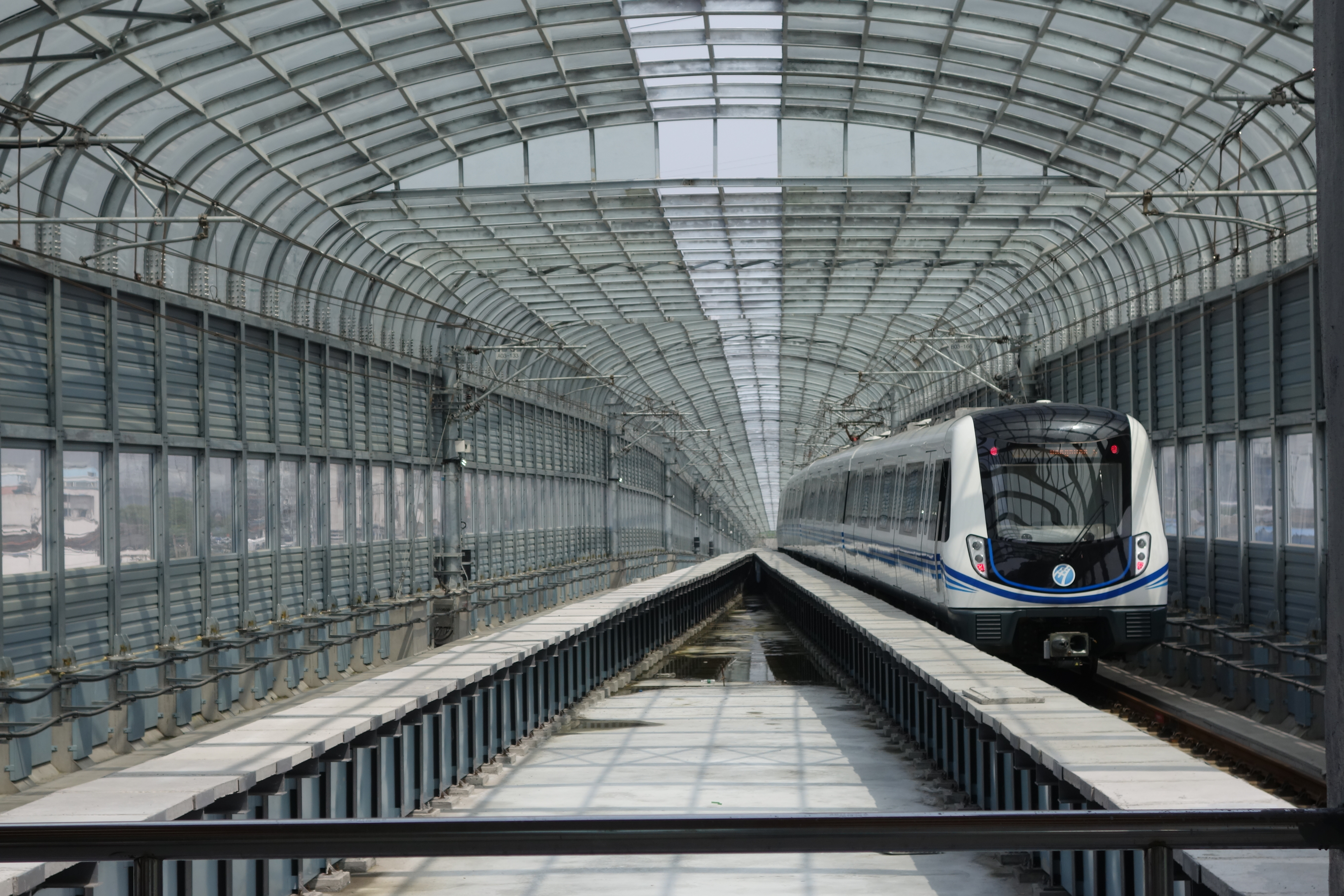
Line 1 train leaving Xujiacao Changle Station

=== Rapid rail transit and subway ===
Ningbo's metro system first began construction in 2009, and opened its first line five years later. As of 2026, it now has nine lines covering the urban districts and some nearby county-level divisions. Some further additions and extensions are also planned or under construction.

Ningbo Rail Transit in 6 Urban Districts of Ningbo (Not Including 2 County-level Cities and 2 Counties)
| Line | Length in Kilometers (km) | Number of Stations | In-Service Year |
Lines in Service
| Line 1 | 46.17 | 29 | 2014 |
| Line 2 | 36.95 | 27 | 2015 |
| Line 3 | 38.63 | 24 | 2019 |
| Line 4 | 39.73 | 27 | 2020 |
| Line 5 | 36.6 | 27 | 2021 |
| Line 6 | 39.6 | 23 | 2026 |
| Line 7 | 39.4 | 25 | 2025 |
| Line 8 | 21.8 | 18 | 2025 |
| Line 12 | 61.45 | 10 | 2026 |
Lines Under Construction
| Line 10 | 63.6 | 13 | 2026-27 |

== Military ==
Ningbo serves as the headquarters of the East Sea Fleet of the Chinese People's Liberation Army Navy.

== Language ==
Ningbo speech is a dialect of Wu Chinese that has preserved many aspects of ancient Chinese phonology. Its original wording mode can be found in classical reference books. After the unequal treaty port opening, western culture gradually permeated Ningbo. Thus, the prefix "洋 yang", meaning ocean or Western, before the nouns of imported goods is a special language phenomenon of Ningbo dialect.

== Food ==
Ningbo is known for Ningbo Tangyuan, small stuffed buns which are boiled. The stuffing is usually ground sesame mixed with sugar or pork fat. The stuffing is then wrapped with sticky rice powder. Ningbo is even more well known throughout China for its seafood. Seafood markets are abundant, carrying extensive varieties of fish, shellfish, snails, jellyfish and other invertebrates, and sea vegetables in all stages of preparation from "still swimming," to cleaned and ready to cook, to fully cooked.

== Education ==
Ningbo has a comprehensive education system encompassing higher education, secondary and primary schooling, and international education. As of the end of 2020, the city had 1,896 schools of all types, enrolling approximately 1.418 million students.

The city is also recognized as one of the world’s top 100 cities for scientific research output, according to the Nature Index. In 2020, Ningbo continued to expand its human capital base, attracting 1,372 additional doctoral degree holders (bringing the total to 9,265), 67,000 highly skilled workers (totaling 551,000), and 166,000 university graduates, representing a year-on-year increase of 20.5%. The city hosted 35 postdoctoral research stations and trained more than 327,000 skilled personnel during the year.

=== Higher education ===
As of May 2021, Ningbo was home to 15 universities and colleges, as well as a growing number of research institutes offering postgraduate programs. Despite this expansion, Ningbo has fewer higher-education institutions than the other sub-provincial cities in China.

Universities and colleges in Ningbo
| English name | Chinese name | Degree programs | Website | Notes |
|---|---|---|---|---|
| Ningbo University | 宁波大学 | Bachelor's, master's, doctoral | https://www.nbu.edu.cn/en/ | A Double First-Class Construction university (selected disciplines) |
| University of Nottingham, Ningbo China | 宁波诺丁汉大学 | Bachelor's, master's, doctoral | https://www.nottingham.edu.cn/en/ | Sino-foreign university affiliated with the University of Nottingham (UK) |
| Ningbo Institute of Technology, Zhejiang University | 浙大宁波理工学院 | Bachelor's, master's, doctoral | http://www.nit.zju.edu.cn/en/ | |
| Zhejiang Wanli University | 浙江万里学院 | Bachelor's, master's | http://en.zwu.edu.cn/ | |
| Ningbo University of Technology | 宁波工程学院 | Bachelor's, master's | http://www.nbut.cn/ | |
| Ningbo University of Finance and Economics | 宁波财经学院 | Bachelor's | http://www.nbut.cn/ | |
| College of Science and Technology, Ningbo University | 宁波大学科学技术学院 | Bachelor's | https://www.ndky.edu.cn/ | Independent college |
| China Coast Guard Academy | 中国人民武装警察部队海警学院 | Bachelor's | | |
| Zhejiang University of Pharmacy | 浙江药科职业大学 | Associate, bachelor's | https://www.zjpc.net.cn/ | |
| Zhejiang Business Technology Institute | 浙江工商职业技术学院 | Associate | https://www.zjbti.net.cn/ | |
| Ningbo Polytechnic | 宁波职业技术学院 | Associate | https://en.nbpt.edu.cn/ | |
| Zhejiang Fashion Institute of Technology | 浙江纺织服装职业技术学院 | Associate | http://www.zjff.edu.cn/ | |
| Ningbo City College of Vocational Technology | 宁波城市职业技术学院 | Associate | https://www.nbcc.cn/ | |
| Ningbo College of Health Sciences | 宁波卫生职业技术学院 | Associate | http://www.nbchs.net/ | |
| Ningbo Childhood Education College | 宁波幼儿师范高等专科学校 | Associate | https://www.nbei.net/ | |

In addition, several leading Chinese universities and national research institutions operate graduate-level campuses or institutes in Ningbo:

Research institutions offering graduate programs in Ningbo
| English name | Chinese name |
|---|---|
| Ningbo Institute of Materials Technology & Engineering, Chinese Academy of Sciences | 中国科学院宁波材料技术与工程研究所 |
| Beihang University Ningbo Research Institute | 北京航空航天大学宁波创新研究院 |
| Zhejiang University Ningbo Campus | 浙江大学宁波校区 |
| Harbin Institute of Technology Ningbo Research Institute | 哈尔滨工业大学宁波智能装备研究院 |
| Dalian University of Technology Ningbo Research Institute | 大连理工大学宁波研究院 |
| Tianjin University Zhejiang Research Institute | 天津大学浙江研究院 |
| Peking University Ningbo Institute of Marine-Derived Pharmaceutical | 北京大学宁波海洋药物研究院 |
| Northwestern Polytechnical University Ningbo Research Institute | 西北工业大学宁波研究院 |

=== Primary and secondary education ===
Compulsory education in Ningbo follows the national system, covering ages 6 to 15 and consisting of six years of primary school and three years of junior secondary school. Both public and private schools operate across the city. Preparation for the Gaokao (高考), the national university entrance examination taken at the end of senior high school, is optional.

By the end of 2020, Ningbo had 86 regular high schools enrolling about 93,000 students, 35 vocational secondary schools with 69,000 students, 230 junior high schools with approximately 217,000 students, and 427 primary schools with 517,000 students. The city also hosted 838 full-time private primary and secondary schools (including kindergartens), enrolling around 258,000 students, accounting for 21.7% of all full-time primary and secondary students. Children of migrant workers constituted a significant share of enrollments, with about 288,000 attending schools in Ningbo.

=== International education ===
Ningbo hosts several international and international-division schools authorized to deliver foreign curricula and enroll international students as alternatives to the Chinese national curriculum.

Access International Academy Ningbo (AIAN) and Ningbo Zhicheng School International (NZSI) offer the American AERO (American Education Reaches Out) curriculum and College Board Advanced Placement programs. The Ningbo International School (NBIS) delivers the Cambridge International Primary and Secondary Curricula, leading to IGCSE and A-Level qualifications. Huamao Multicultural Education Academy is an IB World School, offering the IB Primary Years Programme and the International Baccalaureate Diploma Programme.

== Twin towns – sister cities ==
Ningbo is twinned with:

| City | Country | Since |
|---|---|---|
| Nagaokakyō, Kyoto | Japan | 1983 |
| Aachen | Germany | 1986 |
| Wilmington, Delaware | United States | 1988 |
| Waitakere City | New Zealand | 1998 |
| Rouen | France | 1990 |
| Santos, São Paulo | Brazil | 2002 |
| Uitenhage | South Africa | 2003 |
| Veszprém | Hungary | 2003 |
| Stavanger | Norway | 2004 |
| Varna | Bulgaria | 2004 |
| Bydgoszcz | Poland | 2005 |
| Nottingham | United Kingdom | 2005 |
| Florence | Italy | 2008 |
| Daegu | South Korea | 2013 |
| Bitola | North Macedonia | 2014 |
| Kapan | Armenia | 2016 |
| Heraklion | Greece | 2019 |
| Marrakesh | Morocco | 2019 |
| Alor Setar | Malaysia | 2023 |

== See also ==
- Port of Ningbo-Zhoushan
- List of twin towns and sister cities in China
- New first-tier city
