= Moon Lake (Ningbo) =

- West Lake
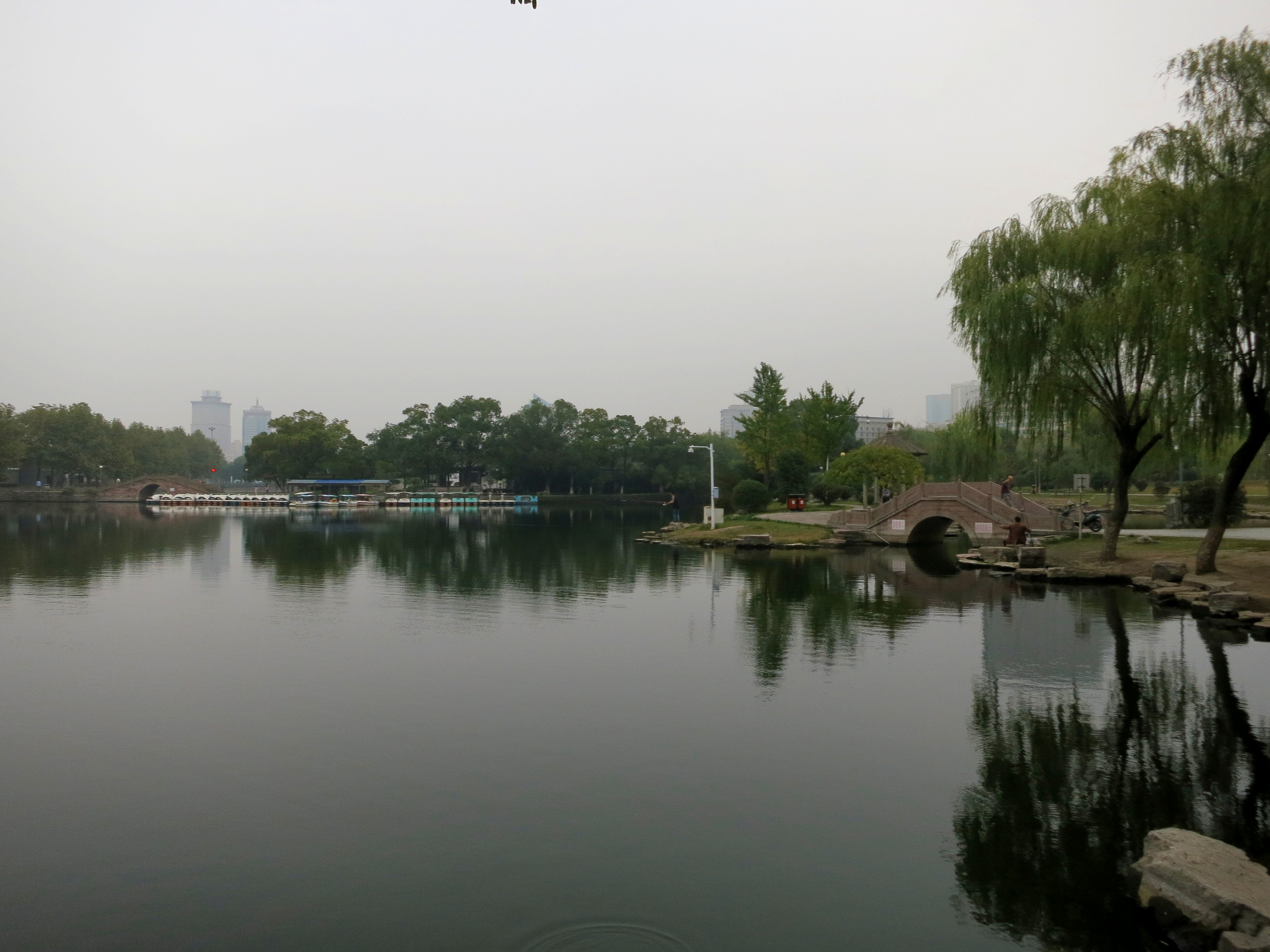

- Location within Zhejiang

- Location: Haishu, Ningbo, Zhejiang
- Coordinates: 29°52′10″N 121°3′22″E
- Type: Man-made lake
- Max. length: 1.03 km (0.64 mi)
- Max. width: 0.22 km (0.14 mi)
- Surface area: 0.2 km^{2} (0.077 sq mi)
- Shore length^{1}: 2.6 km (1.6 mi)
- ^{1} Shore length is not a well-defined measure.

The Moon Lake, also known as the West Lake, is a man-made lake in Haishu District, Ningbo, Zhejiang. It is a municipal conservation zone for history and culture in Ningbo.

== Main features ==
- Moon Lake Bridge (月湖桥) – also known as Central Lake East Bridge, a stone arch bridge. It was firstly built in Song and current bridge was built in Qing.
- Central Lake Temple (湖心寺) – Central Lake Temple is located in Southeastern Huayu, which was firstly established in Zhiping period in North Song Dynasty. The temple is referenced in a poem by Sima Guang.
- Shuize Stele (水则碑) – Shuize Stele is a stone stele which is used to measure water level in Pingqiao River near the Moon Lake. It was firstly built in South Song Dynasty and protected by a pavilion which was built during the Qing Dynasty.
- He Mijian Shrine (贺秘监祠) – He Mijian Shrine was firstly built in South Song Dynasty in order to worship He Zhizhang, a poet in Tang.
- Guandi Temple (关帝庙) – Guandi Temple was built in 3rd year of Chongzhen of Ming Dynasty, currently used as the Ningbo Buddhism cultural exhibition centre.
- Buddhist Jushi lin (佛教居士林) – Buddhist Jushilin (Householders) is a Buddhist temple in the Moon Lake. It was built in 21st year of Zhiyuan in Yuan Dynasty (AD 1284). It was destroyed in 1956, and rebuilt in 1989.
- Yanyu House (烟屿楼) Yanyu House is a famous library in Ningbo. It was built by Xu Shidong, an academician of East Zhejiang, local choreography and a librarian.
- Li's House (李宅) – The Li's House is a house of ancestors of the Chinese American Li Zongkui, originally located in Tianyi Square region. It was moved when the construction of Tianyi Square.
- Yintaidi (银台第) – The house of Tong Kui, a vice ambassador of Tongzhengsi. Currently, it is the Ningbo Officials' House Museum.
- Ambassy of Goryeo (高丽使馆) – The reception place was for ambassadors, businessmen and overseas students. The building was rebuilt on the originally place.

== Literary reference ==
A Ningbo-born novelist Qu You wrote a fiction called Peony Dengji (牡丹灯记, Janpanese: Botan Dōrō also known as 怪談牡丹灯籠 Tales of the Peony Lantern ) (in the collection of Jiandeng Xinhua). It describes a love story between ghost and a man during Fang Guozhen period. The story took place at the Moon Lake. Japanese scholar Koyama Issei identified many of the locations, including Central Lake Temple, Central Lake East Bridge, Zhenming Ridge and Xuanmiao temple, that would fit geographically and architecturally of the places mentioned in the story. The story was adapted as one of three Kaidan tales in Japan.

== Pictures ==
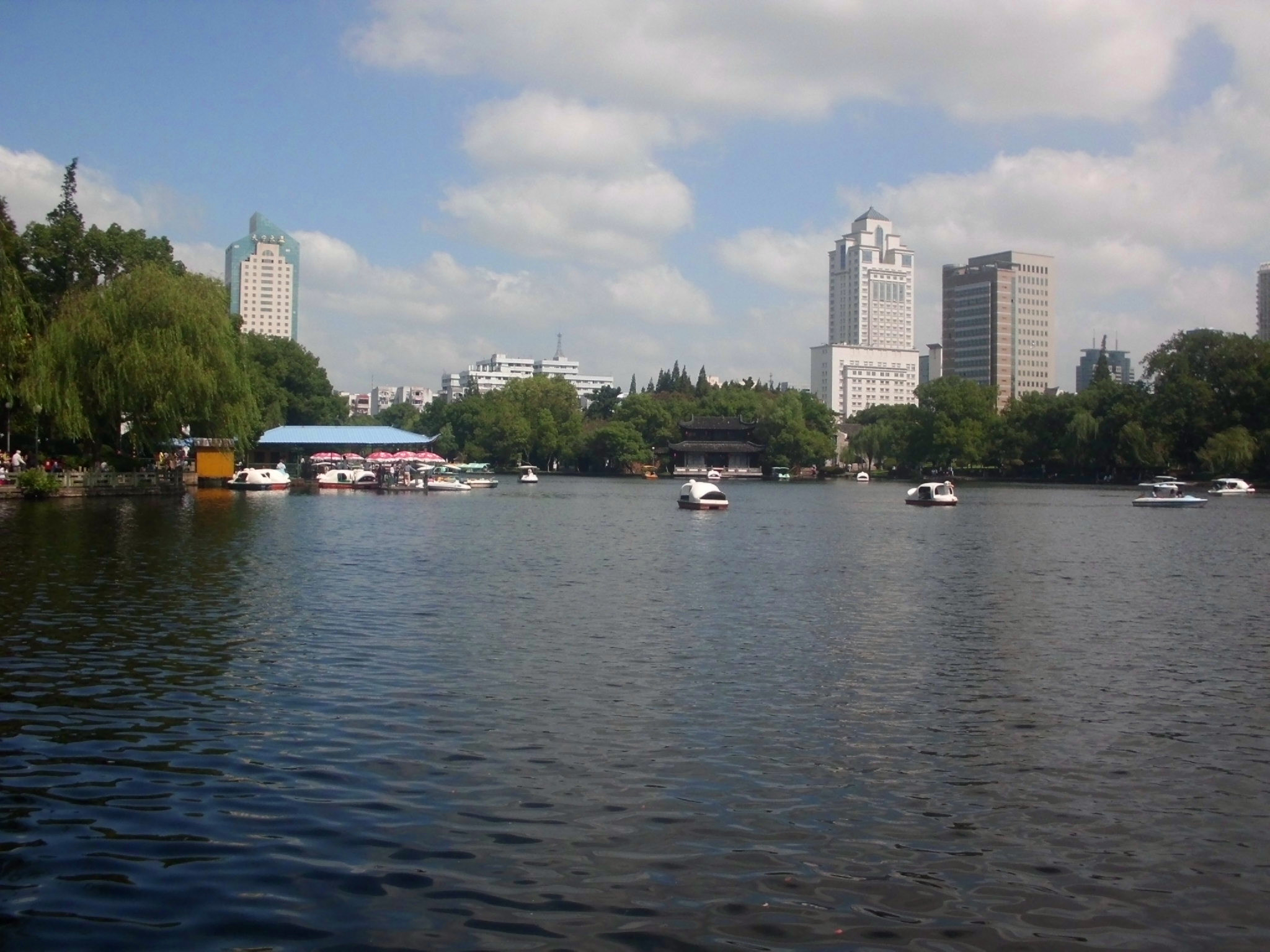

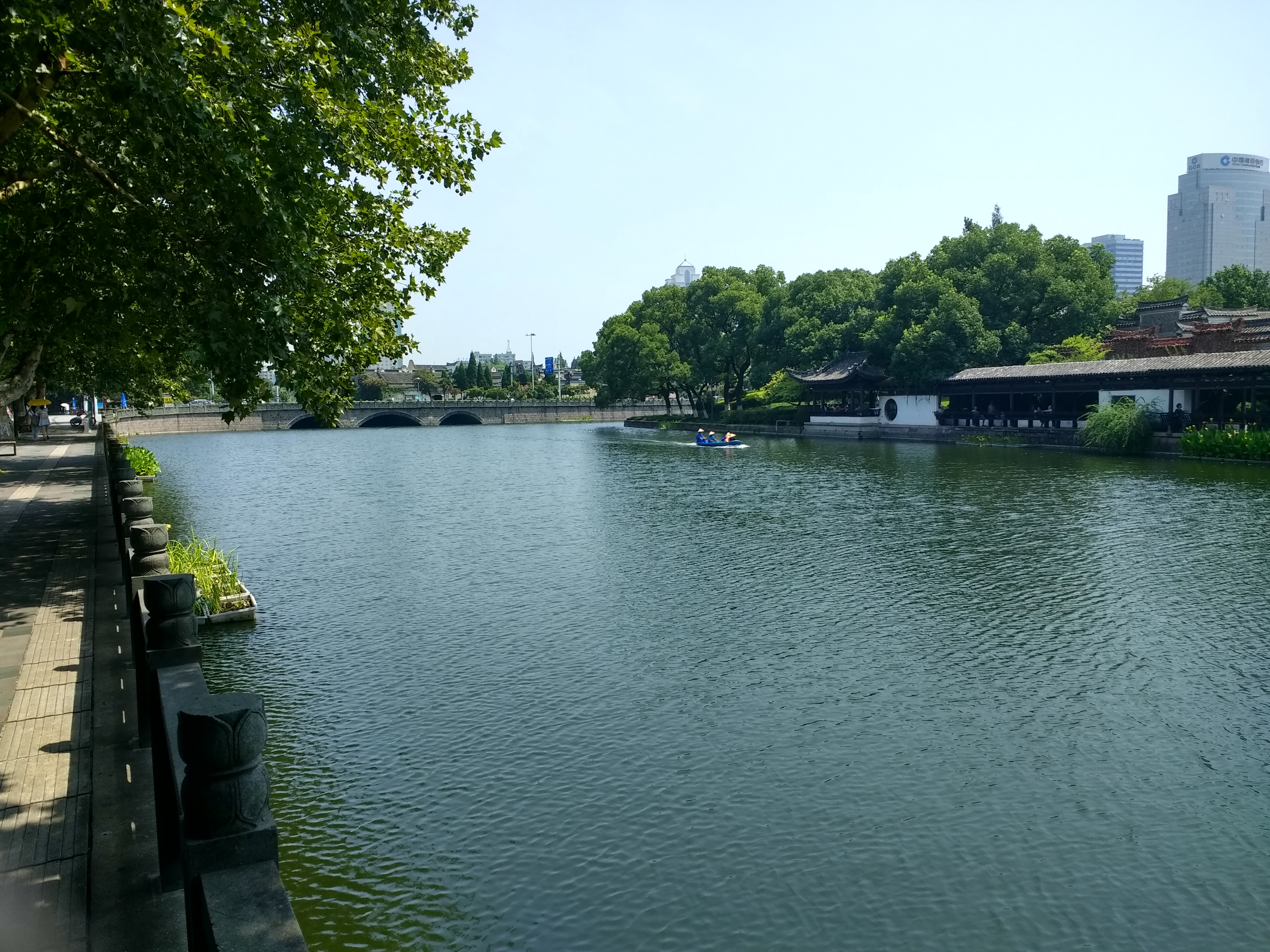

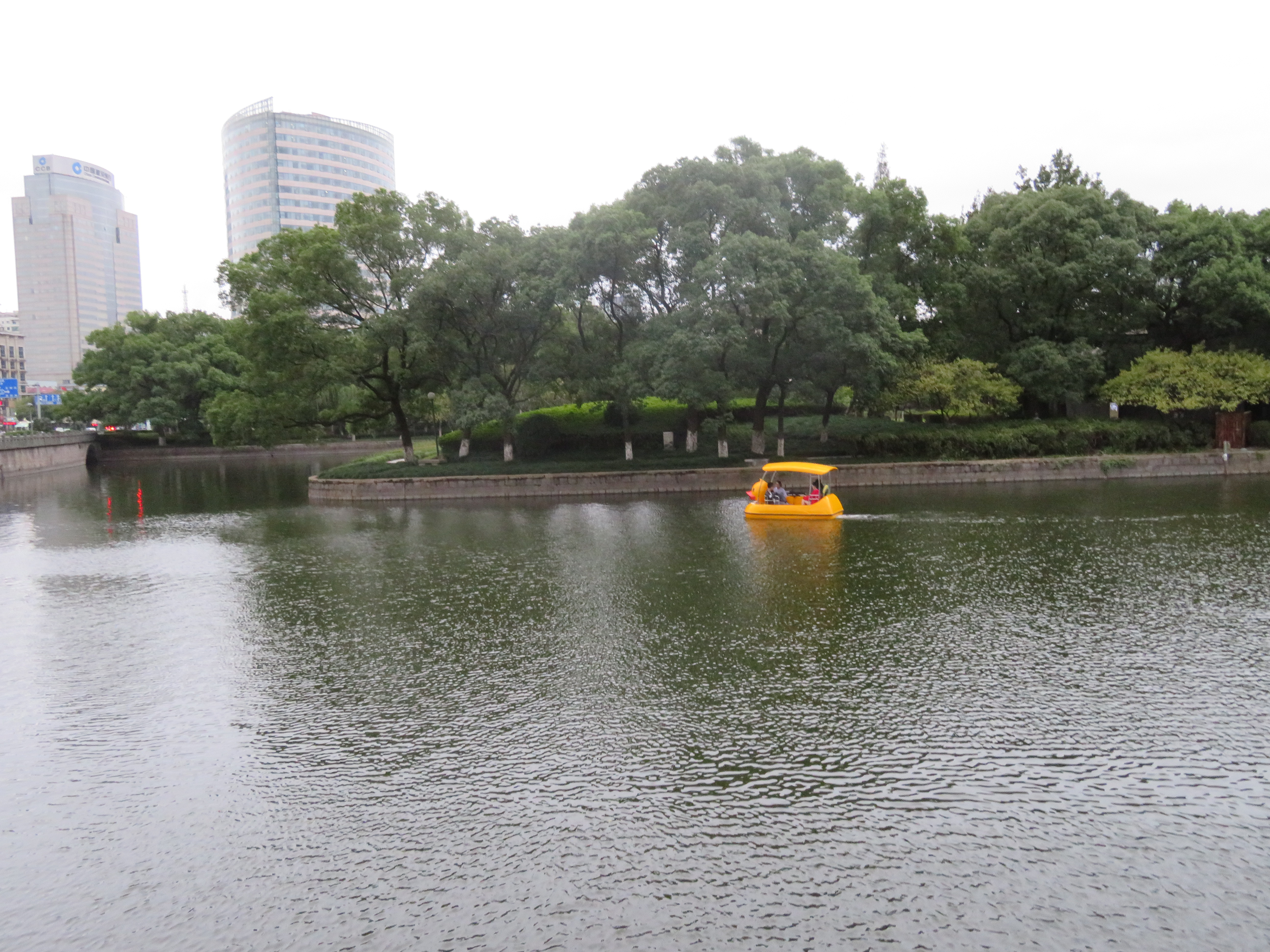

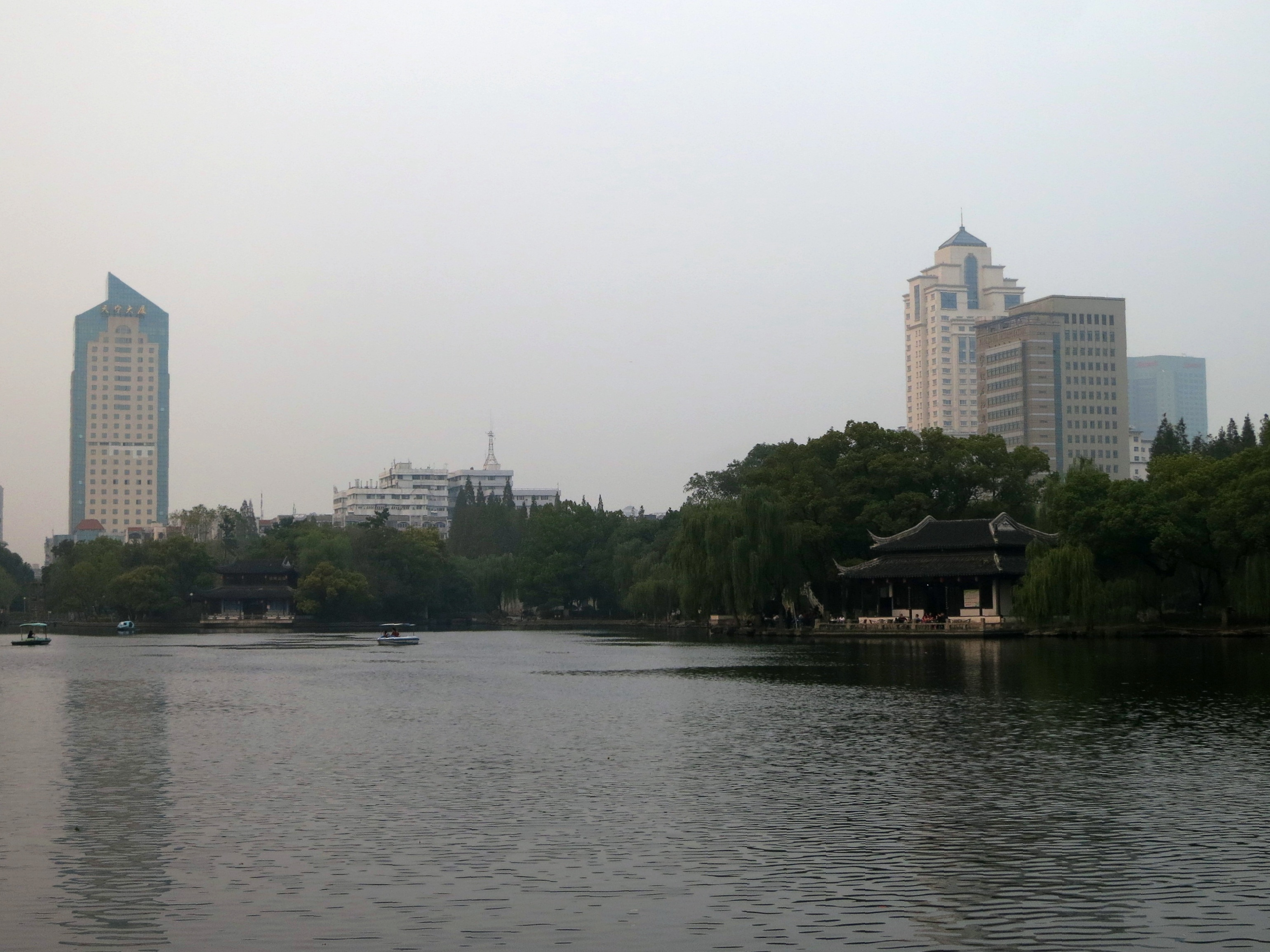

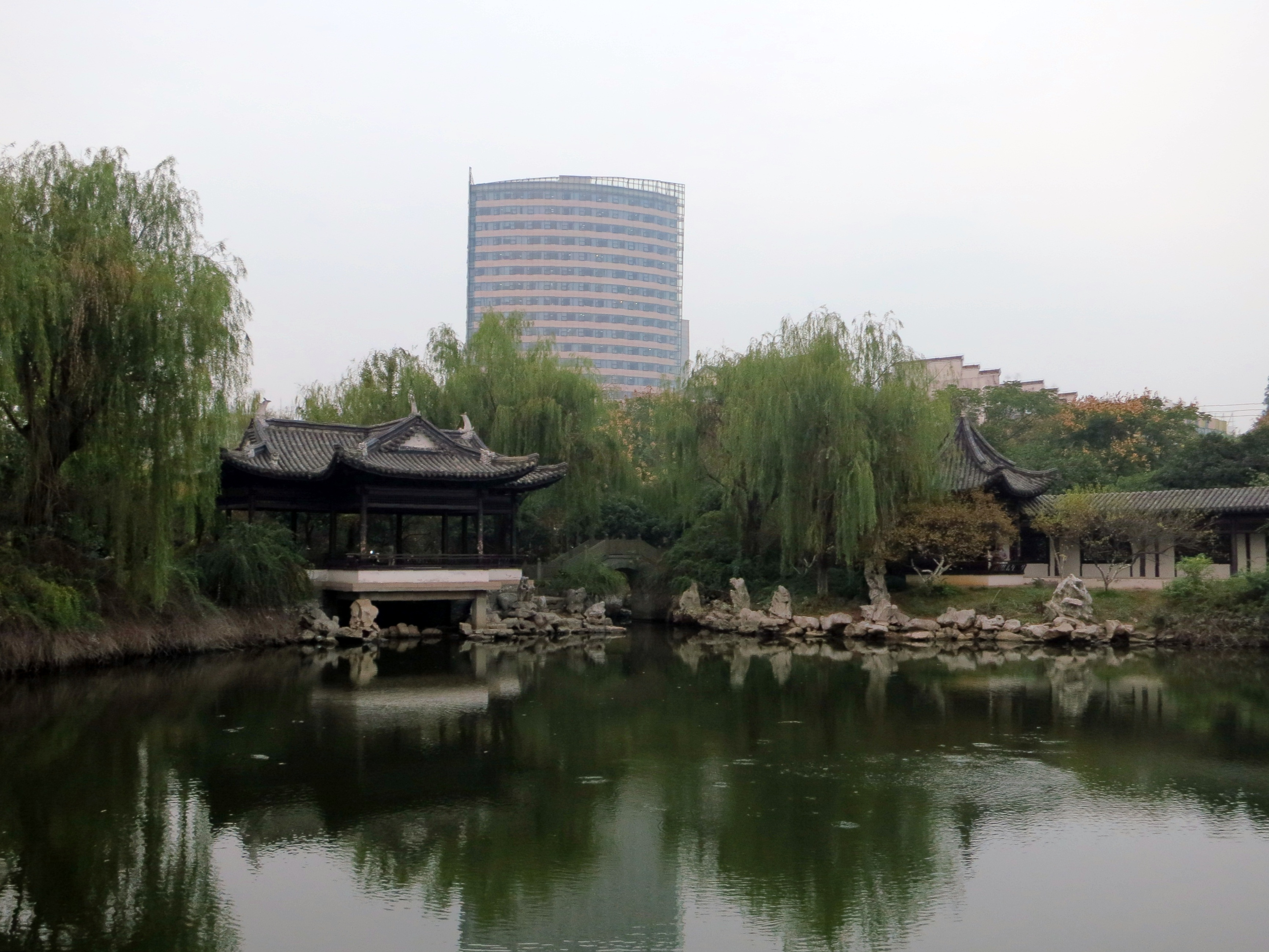

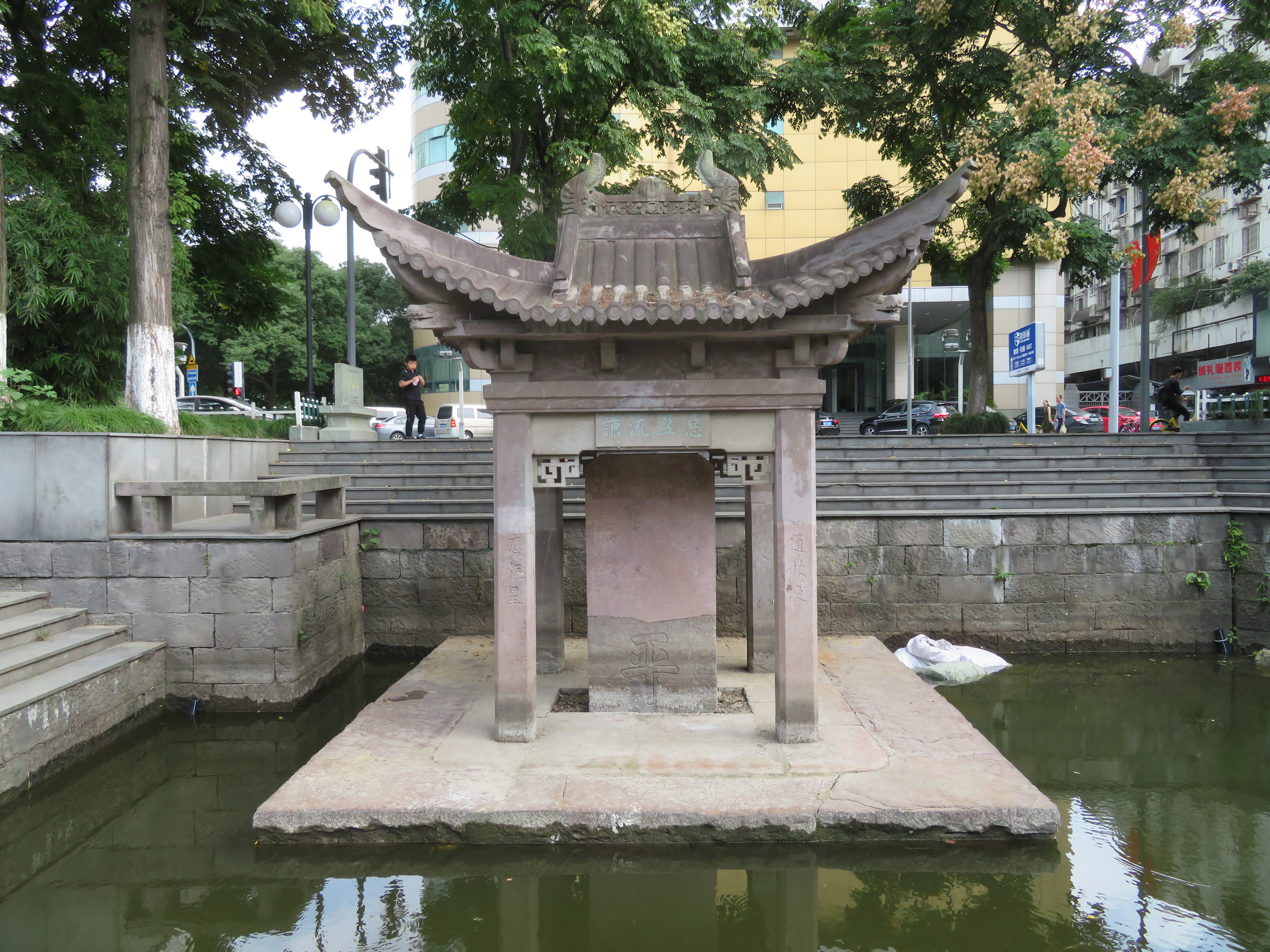
