= Dongqiao =

Dongqiao is the name of the following locations in China:

== Towns ==
- Dongjiao, Putian (东峤镇), ('Dongqiao') in Xiuyu District, Putian, Fujian
- Dongqiao, Hangzhou (洞桥镇), in Fuyang, Zhejiang
- Dongqiao, Ningbo (洞桥镇), in Yinzhou District

Written as "东桥镇":

- Dongqiao, Anhui, in Jin'an District, Lu'an
- Dongqiao, Hui'an County, Fujian
- Dongqiao, Minqing County, Fujian
- Dongqiao, Hubei, in Zhongxiang

== Villages ==
- Dongqiao, Tibet (东巧村)
