= Temple of King Ashoka =

Buddhist temple in Zhejiang, China

- 阿育王寺
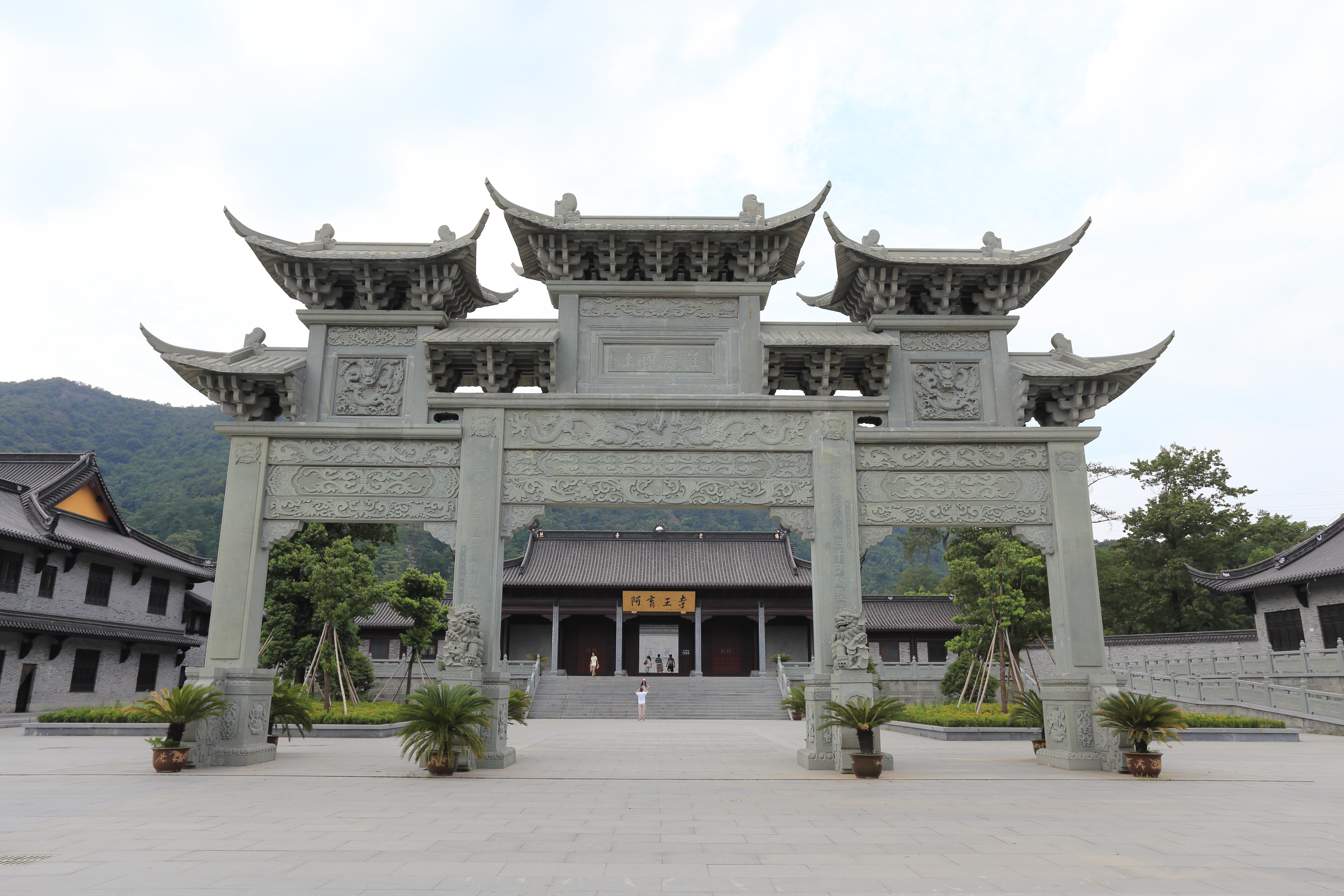
- A paifang in front of the temple.

- Location within Zhejiang

Religion
- Affiliation: Buddhism
- Sect: Chan Buddhism - Linji school
- Leadership: Shi Yixing (释一行)

Location
- Location: Yinzhou District, Ningbo, Zhejiang
- Country: China
- Coordinates: 29°51′09″N 121°45′00″E

Architecture
- Style: Chinese architecture
- Founder: Huida (慧达)
- Established: 282
- Completed: 19th century (reconstruction)

Temple of King Ashoka (Chinese: 阿育王寺; pinyin: Āyùwāng Sì) is a Buddhist temple located in Yinzhou District of Ningbo, Zhejiang, China.

== History ==
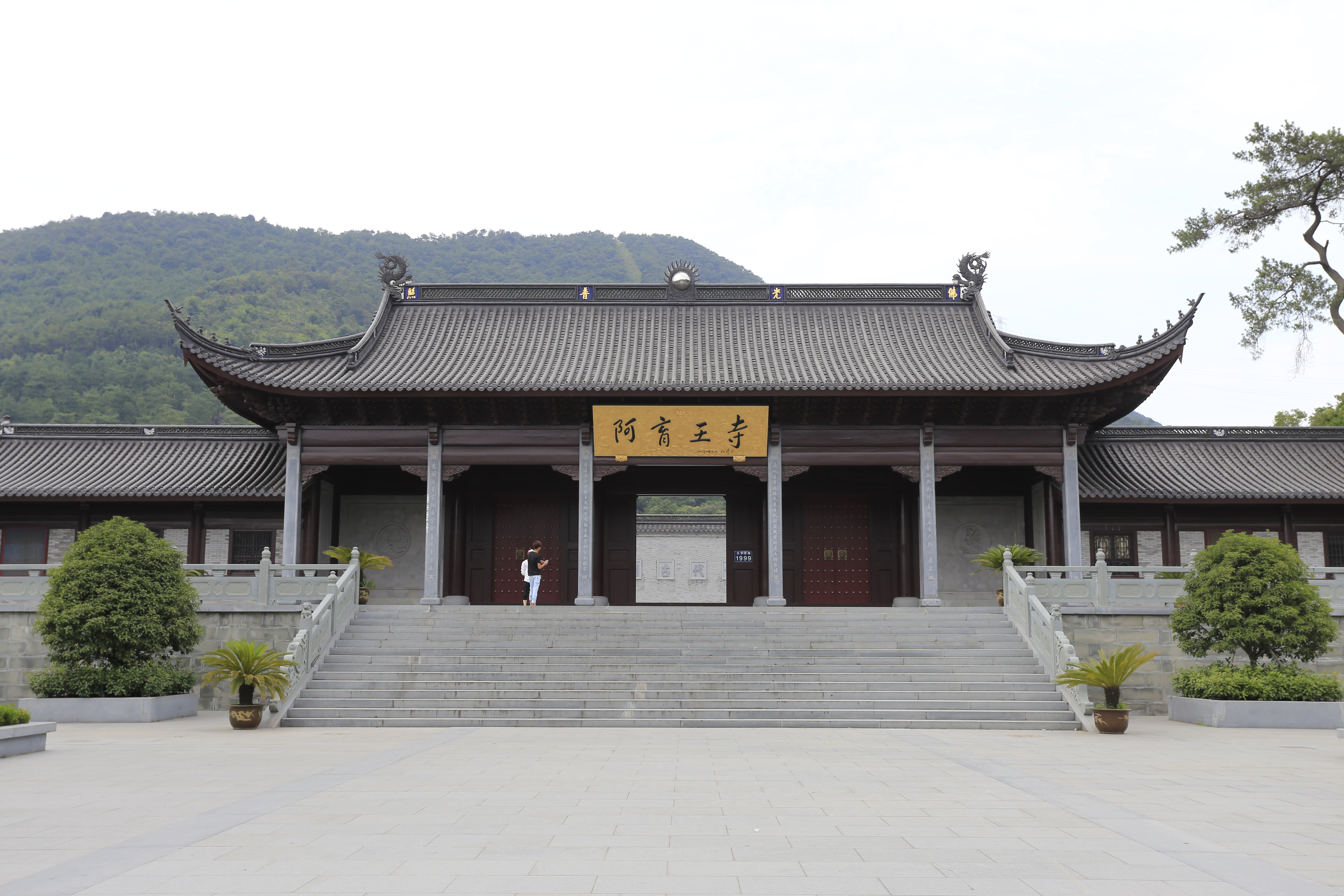
Shanmen at the temple.

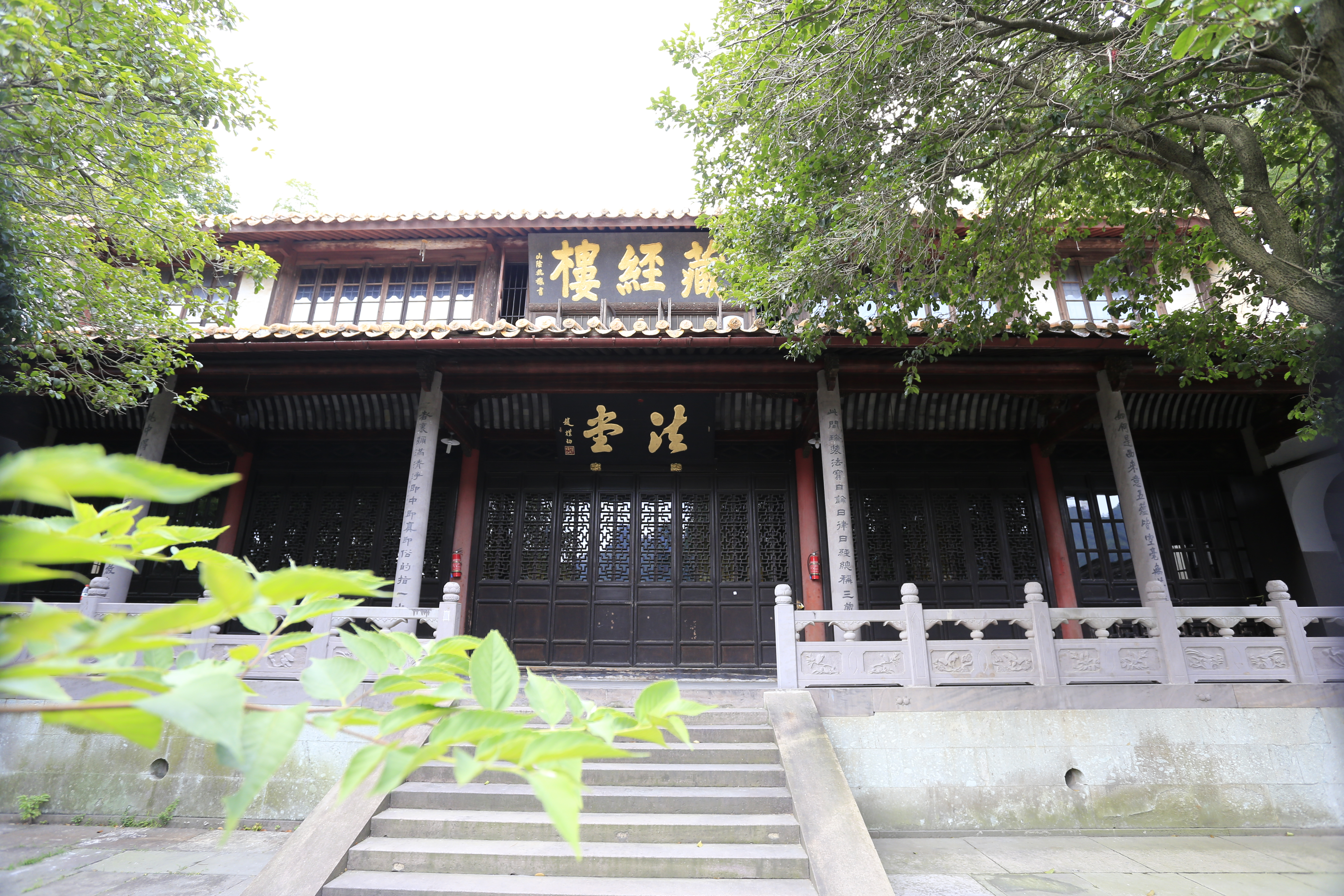
The Buddhist Texts Library at the temple.

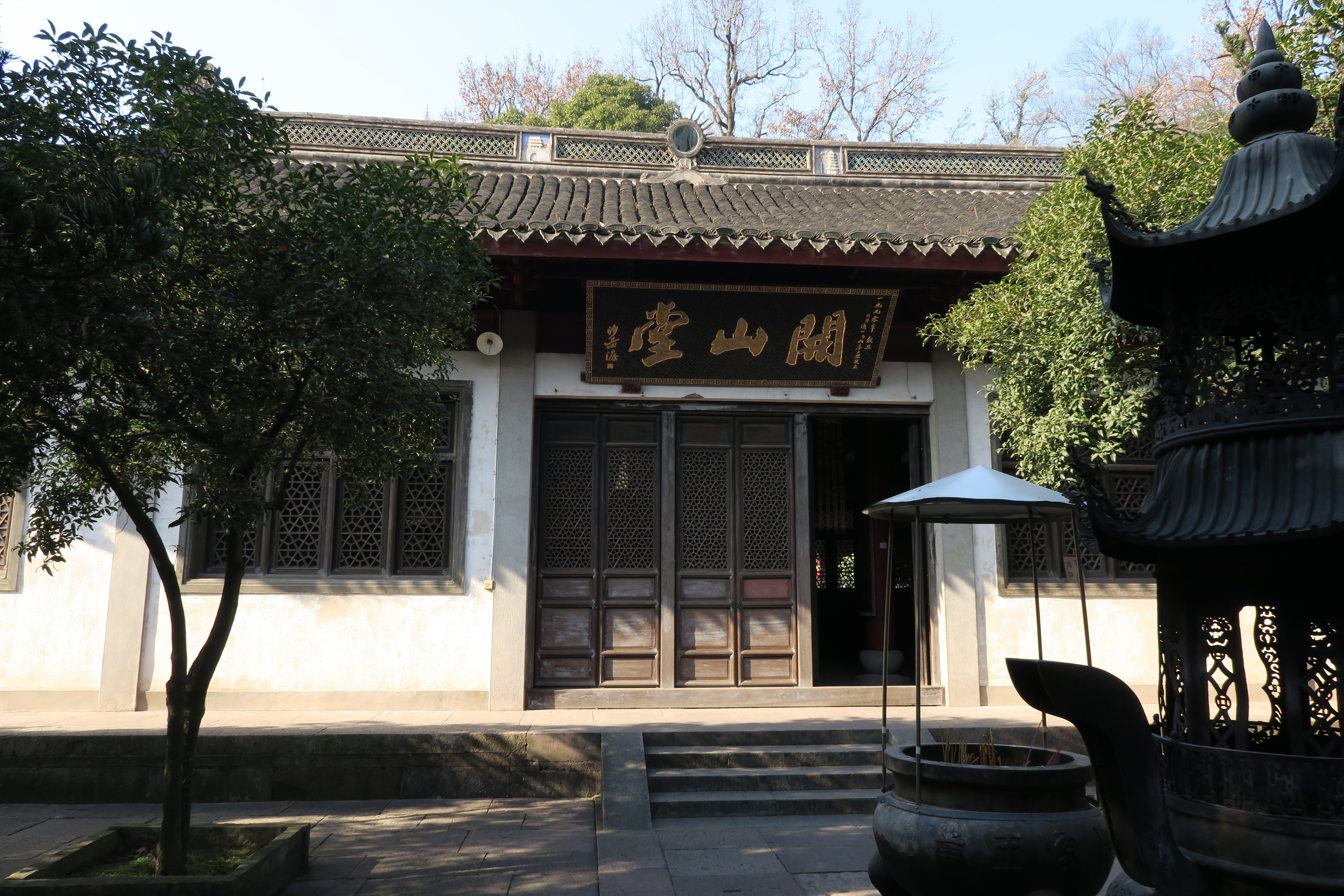
The Hall of Guru at the temple.

=== Western Jin dynasty ===
The temple was first established in 282 by monk Huida (惠達) from the Western Regions, under the Western Jin dynasty (265–317).

=== Eastern Jin dynasty ===
In 405 in the Eastern Jin dynasty (317–420), the stupa was relocated to the present site. The Emperor An of Jin issued the decree building a pavilion to protect the stupa.

=== Southern dynasty ===
In 425, in the 2nd year of Yuanjia period (424–453) in the Liu Song dynasty (420–479), Emperor Wendi ordered abbot Daoyou (道佑) to enlarge the temple. The construction took 10 years, and lasted from 425 to 435.

In 522, in the 3rd year of Putong period (520–527) in the Liang dynasty (502–557), Emperor Wudi inscribed and honored the name "Temple of King Ashoka" (阿育王寺). In 540, Emperor Wudi donated 500 gold taels to establish a five-story pagoda, a bronze statue of Shakyamuni Buddha and an iron tripod. The Temple of King Ashoka rose to fame under the support of the central government.

=== Tang dynasty ===
In 713, in the 2nd year of Xiantian period (712–713) in the Tang dynasty (618–907), monk Liaoyuan (了緣) elected the Western Pagoda Temple (西塔院). In 744, after the third time failed in travel east to Japan, eminent Vinaya Master Jianzhen settled at the Temple of King Ashoka, where he taught Buddhism (Risshū in Japan) and attracted large numbers of Buddhist practitioners.

Emperor Wuzong (814–846) who was a devout Taoist and due to socio-economic agenda, initiated the Huichang Persecution of Buddhism and ordered to demolish many Buddhist temples, confiscated temple lands and forcing monks to disrobe. The stupa was confiscated. Nine years later, in the reign of Emperor Xuanzong, the stupa was sent back to the Temple of King Ashoka. Over 8,000 monks attended the consecration ceremony.

=== Five Dynasties and Ten Kingdoms ===
The Temple of King Ashoka was devastated by a disastrous fire in 958 in the 5th year of Xiande period (954–960) in the Later Zhuo dynasty (951–960).

=== Song dynasty ===
The Temple of King Ashoka was restored and redecorated in 937, in the 6th year of Kaibao period (968–976) in the Northern Song dynasty (960–1127).

In 1008, in the ruling of Emperor Zhenzong (998–1022), the emperor renamed it "Shanguangli Chan Temple of King Ashoka" (阿育王山廣利禪寺)

In 1068, under the rule of Emperor Shenzong (1068–1085), Huailian (怀琏) was proposed as the fifth abbot of the temple. Under the leadership of Huailian, the temple was growing of a resurgence of spiritual and religious inquiry.

During the Jianyan period (1127–1130) of the Southern Song dynasty (1127–1279), the stupa was transferred to the imperial palace for worship, Emperor Gaozong bestowed a plaque on the temple with the Chinese characters "佛頂光明之塔". In 1156, master Zonggao (宗杲) was appointed the new abbot of the temple. The temple had reached unprecedented heyday at that time with more than 6,000 monks lived in the temple.

In 1174, Emperor Xiaozong inscribed a plaque with the words "妙胜之殿" to the temple and bestowed the abbot Congkuo (從廓) upon the title of "Miaozhi Chan Master" (妙智禪師).

During the Jiading period (1208–1224), alongside Jingshan Temple, Lingyin Temple, Jingci Temple and Tiantong Temple, the Temple of King Ashoka was hailed as one of the Five Mountains.

After the fall of the Southern Song dynasty, the temple went to ruin during the Mongolian invasion of the 13th century.

=== Yuan dynasty ===
During the reign of Emperor Shizu (1260–1294) of the Yuan dynasty (1271–1368), Wanji (頑極) and Rugong (如珙) successively served as abbot of the Temple of King Ashoka.

In 1342, in the Zhizheng era (1341–1368), abbot Wuguang (悟光) refurbished and renovated the Guru Hall, Dharma Hall and other halls and rooms. He used the government rewards to established the Cheng'en Pavilion (承恩閣).

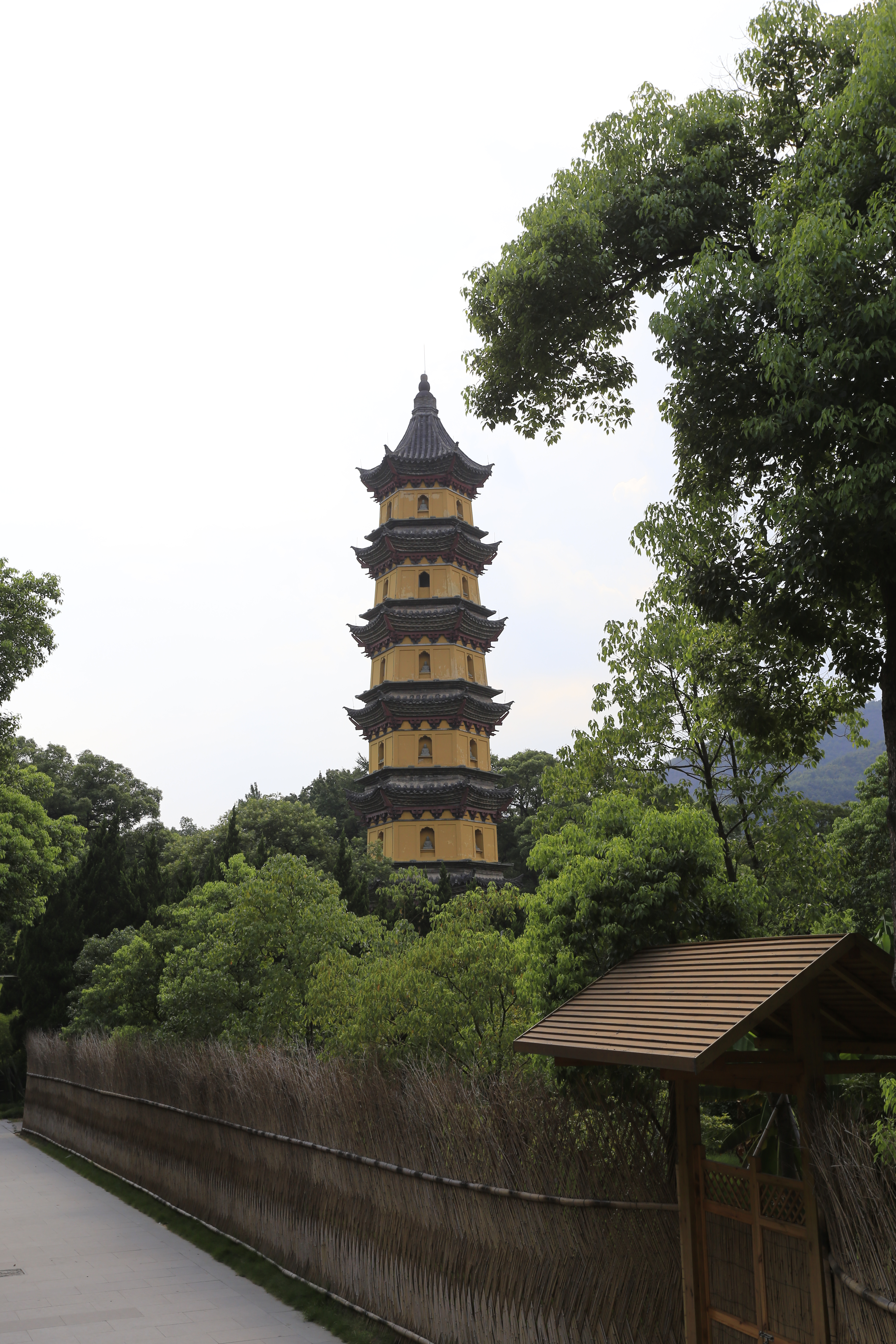
The Western Pagoda.

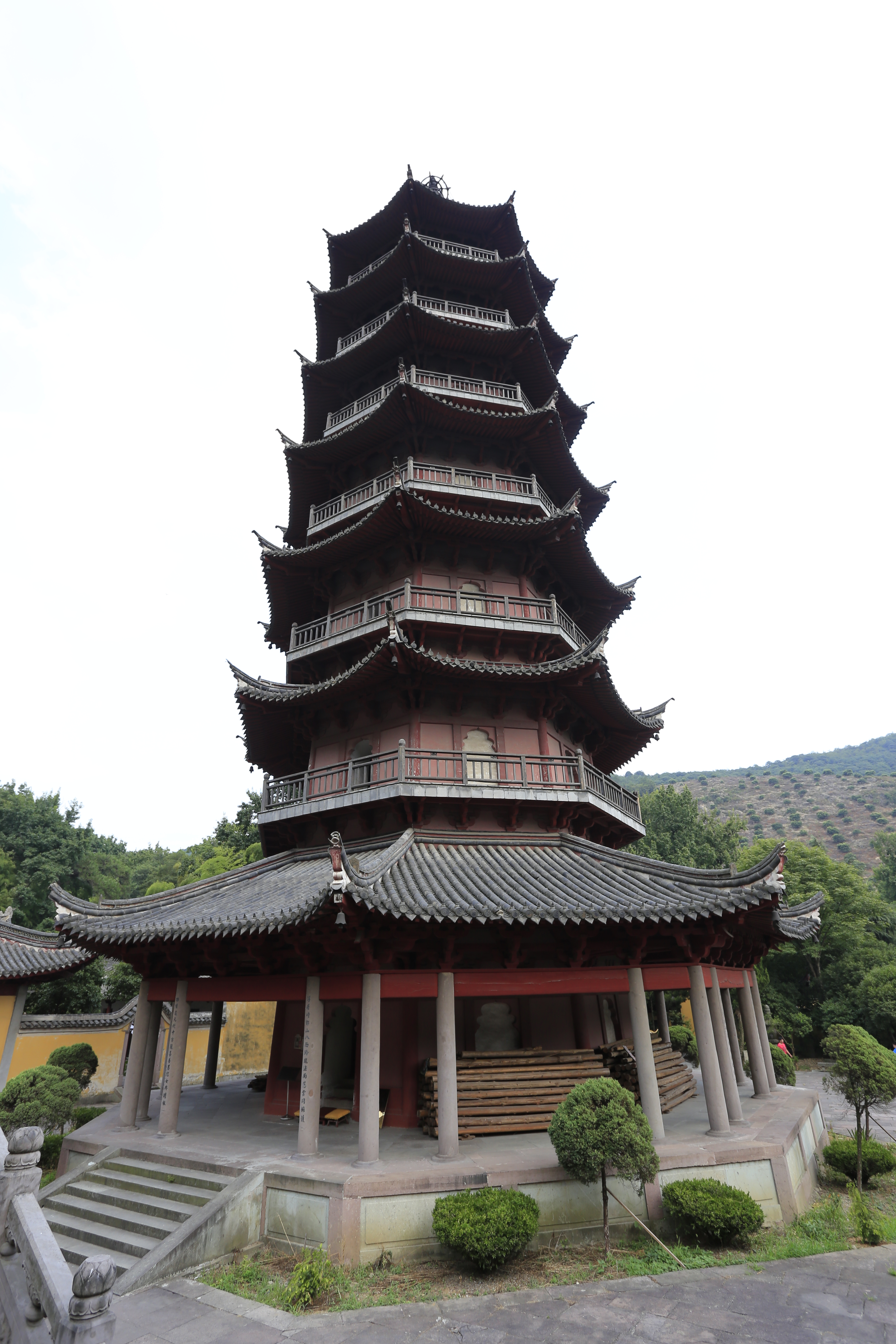
The Eastern Pagoda.

=== Ming dynasty ===
In 1382, in the 15th year of Hongwu period (1368–1398) in the Ming dynasty, Hongwu Emperor renamed the temple "Chan Temple of King Ashoka" (阿育王山禪寺).

During the Wanli era (1573–1620), a bronze stupa was erected by Empress Dowager Xiaoding. Abbot Chuanping (傳瓶) founded the Shanmen, Meditation Hall, corridors and monk's rooms. At that time, the temple had over 100 halls and rooms.

=== Qing dynasty ===
A catastrophic fire consumed the temple in 1662, the year of Kangxi Emperor (1662–1722) of the Qing dynasty (1644–1911) ascended the throne. The Temple of King Ashoka was reconstructed by monk Fazhong (法忠) in 1680.

During the reign of Qianlong Emperor (1736–1795), the emperor donated many valuable cultural relics and treasures to the temple, including purple cassock, Heart Sutra and Nīlakaṇṭha Dhāraṇī.

In the Guangxu era (1875–1908), Putong Pagoda Hall, Yangxin Hall, Yunshui Hall, Lingju Hall, Four Heavenly Kings Hall and abbot's room were gradually built. And the Mahavira Hall was renovated and redecorated in 1911, in the year of the downfall of the Qing dynasty.

=== Republic of China ===
Abbot Zongliang (宗亮) supervised the reconstruction of Great Compassion Hall and Meditation Hall between 1912 and 1916. The Four Heavenly Kings Hall reduced to ashes by a devastating fire in 1930. After two years it was rebuilt by abbot Yuanlong (源巃).

=== People's Republic of China ===
In 1966, Mao Zedong launched the devastating ten-year Cultural Revolution, the communist government brutally forced Buddhist monks to renounce their monastic vows and return to secular life, all Buddhist statues were destroyed and the temple was used as factory and barracks.

After the 3rd Plenary Session of the 11th Central Committee of the Chinese Communist Party, according to the national policy of free religious belief, regular sutras lectures, meditation and other features of temple life were resumed.

The Temple of King Ashoka was inscribed as a provincial cultural preservation unit by the Zhejiang Provincial Government in April 1981.

The Temple of King Ashoka has been designated as a National Key Buddhist Temple in Han Chinese Area by the State Council of China in 1983.

The administrative control of the temple was finally transferred to Buddhist community in September 1988, and the government has allocated CN¥ 0.6 million for the reconstruction project.

Construction of the Eastern Pagoda, designed by abbot Tongyi (通一), commenced in 1992 and was completed in 1995.

In May 2006, it was listed among the sixth group of "Major National Historical and Cultural Sites in Zhejiang" by the State Council of China.

== Architecture ==
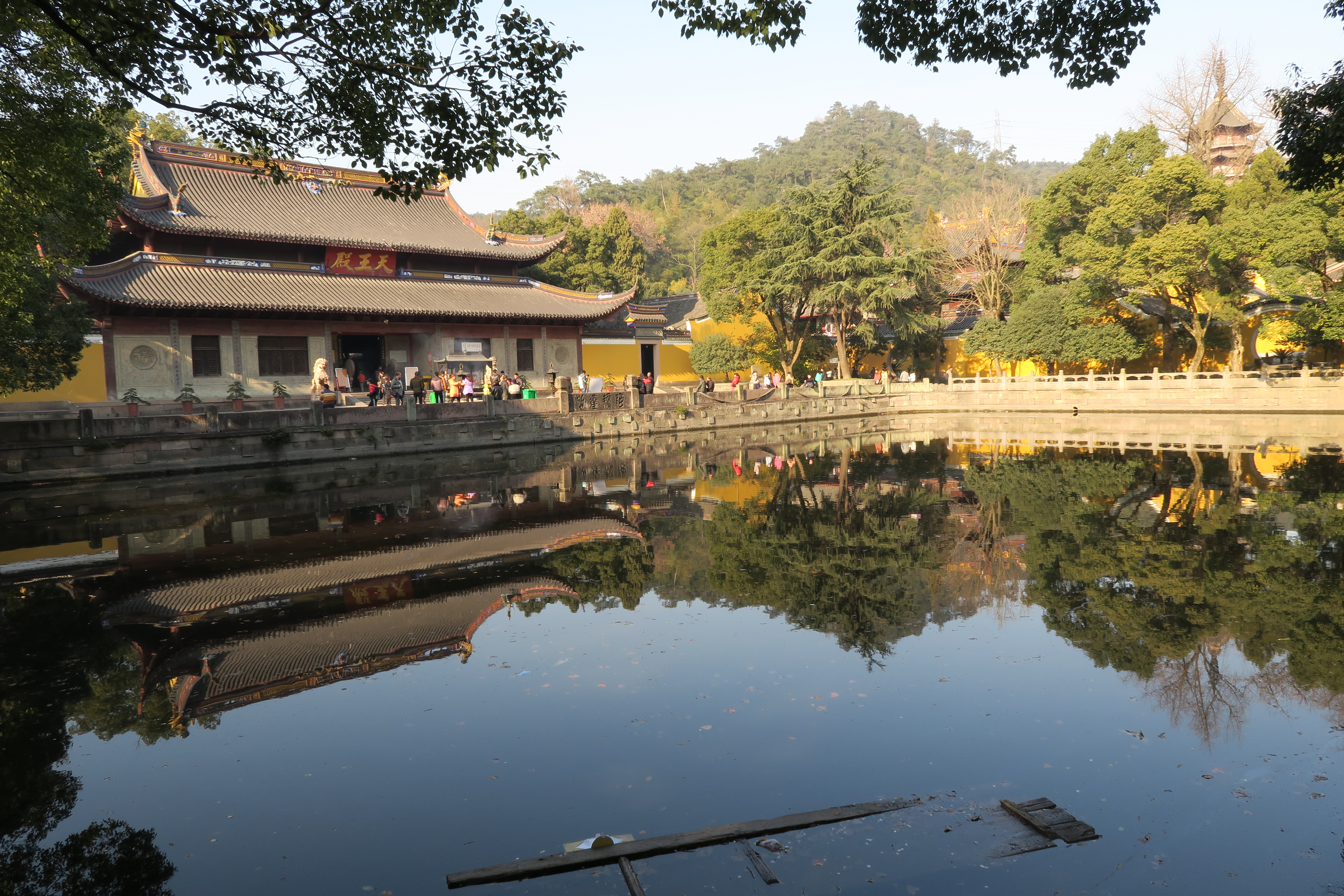
The Four Heavenly Kings Hall and Free Life Pond at the temple.

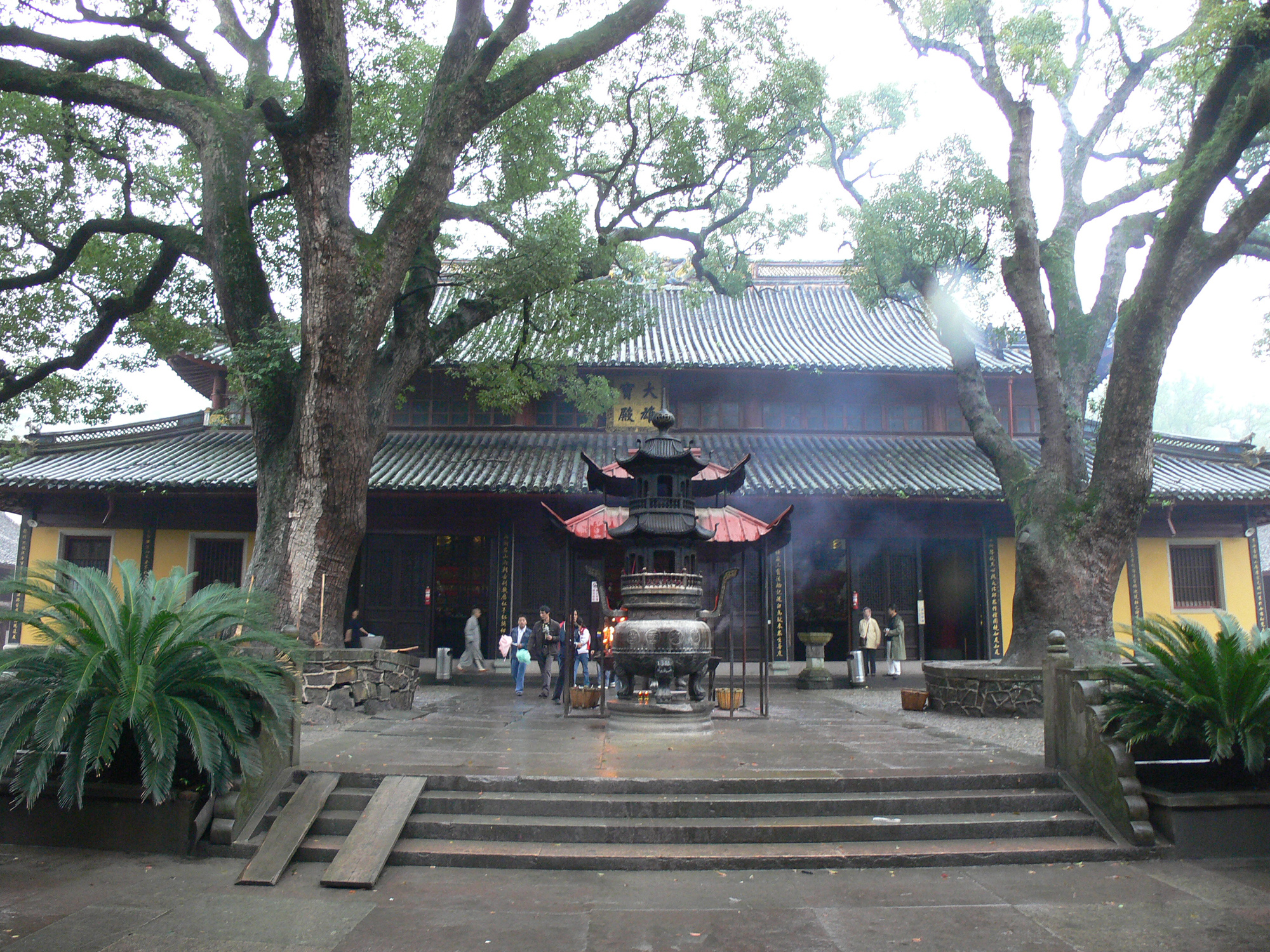
Mahavira Hall at the temple.

The Temple of King Ashoka occupies a building area of 23,400 square metres (252,000 sq ft) and the total area including temple lands, forests and mountains is over 124,100 square metres (1,336,000 sq ft).

Along the central axis are the Shanmen, Free Life Pond, Four Heavenly Kings Hall, Mahavira Hall, Hall of Sarira, Dharma Hall and Buddhist Texts Library. There are over 625 halls and rooms on both sides, including Guru Hall, Cheng'en Hall, Bell tower, Drum tower, Abbot Hall, Monastic Dining Hall, Monastic Reception Hall and Meditation Hall.

=== Four Heavenly Kings Hall ===
Maitreya is enshrined in the Hall of Four Heavenly Kings and at the back of his statue is a statue of Skanda. Statues of Four Heavenly Kings are enshrined in the left and right side of the hall. Under the eaves is a plaque with the Chinese characters "八吉祥地" written by Zhao Puchu, the former president of Buddhist Association of China.

=== Mahavira Hall ===
The Mahavira Hall is seven rooms wide and 14 metres (46 ft) high. The hall enshrining the statues of Sakyamuni, Amitabha and Bhaisajyaguru. The two disciples' statues are placed in front of the statue of Sakyamuni, the older is called Kassapa Buddha and the middle-aged is called Ananda. In the center of the eaves of the hall is a plaque, on which there are the words "觉行俱圆". Another plaque with "善狮子吼" written by Qianlong Emperor is hung in the interior side of the hall. At the back of the hall enshrines the statue of Guanyin with Shancai standing on the left and Longnü on the right. And the statues of Eighteen Arhats stand on both sides of the hall.

=== Buddhist Texts Library ===
The two storey Buddhist Texts Library is five rooms wide and 12.5 metres (41 ft) high. Two sets of Chinese Buddhist canon which were printed in the Yongzheng and Qianlong periods of the Qing dynasty are preserved in the hall.
