= Shan Lie =

Chinese politician

Shan Lie (單烈; born 1963) is a political figure from China, born in Fenghua, Zhejiang. Currently serving as the Chief Inspector at the Zhejiang Provincial Radio and Television Bureau, he has previously held positions as the Deputy Director and Chinese Communist Party Deputy Committee Secretary at the bureau.

== Biography ==
He joined the Chinese Communist Party in December 1984 and started working in July 1986. Throughout his career, he has held various positions, including Director of the Copyright Office at the Zhejiang Provincial Press and Publication Bureau and Deputy District Mayor of Yinzhou District, Ningbo City, Zhejiang Province. In October 2004, he became the deputy director of the Zhejiang Provincial Press and Publication Bureau, and in January 2018, he took on the roles of Chinese Communist Party Deputy Committee Secretary and deputy director of the Zhejiang Provincial Press and Publication Bureau. On May 20, 2019, he was appointed as the deputy director of the Zhejiang Provincial Radio and Television Bureau. On February 17, 2023, he was relieved of his position as the deputy director of the Zhejiang Provincial Radio and Television Bureau.。

== Children ==
Shan Lie has an eldest daughter, Shan Chunqing (單春晴), and he also has a pair of twins. The biological origin of the twins has been publicly questioned by his eldest daughter.

== Argument ==
In 2021, Shan Lie's eldest daughter, Shan Chunqing (formerly known as Shan Ting 单挺), who is a transgender and won the award about supercomputer, claimed to have faced discrimination and rejection from her family after undergoing gender reassignment surgery. She publicly accused her father of spending a significant amount on surrogacy to obtain a pair of twins. Furthermore, she alleged that her parents attempted to harm her to protect their twins from her influence. The Zhejiang authorities have not responded to the reported allegations.
