= Longguan =

Longguan may refer to the following locations in China:

- Longguan, Hebei (龙关镇), town in Chicheng County
- Longguan Township (龙观乡), Yinzhou District, Ningbo, Zhejiang
