= Ningbo Southern Business District =

Planned economic area in Ningbo, China

The Ningbo Southern Business District ("NSBD") is a planned economic area within the Yinzhou District of Ningbo, China. It was established to attract "added-value" personnel into the region. It began operations on November 16, 2010.

The District received government stimulus and support to foster its growth. One form of this support has been through establishing the "Ningbo Industrial Advertising Park," which was labeled a national-level economic zone.

== History ==
As of October 2015, the first of four phases had been completed with an 88.9% settlement rate.

In March 2020, the zone was restricted for foreign travelers by the Ministry of Foreign Affairs of the People's Republic of China National Immigration Administration.
