= Tiantong Temple =

Notable Chan Buddhist temple in Ningbo, China

- 天童寺
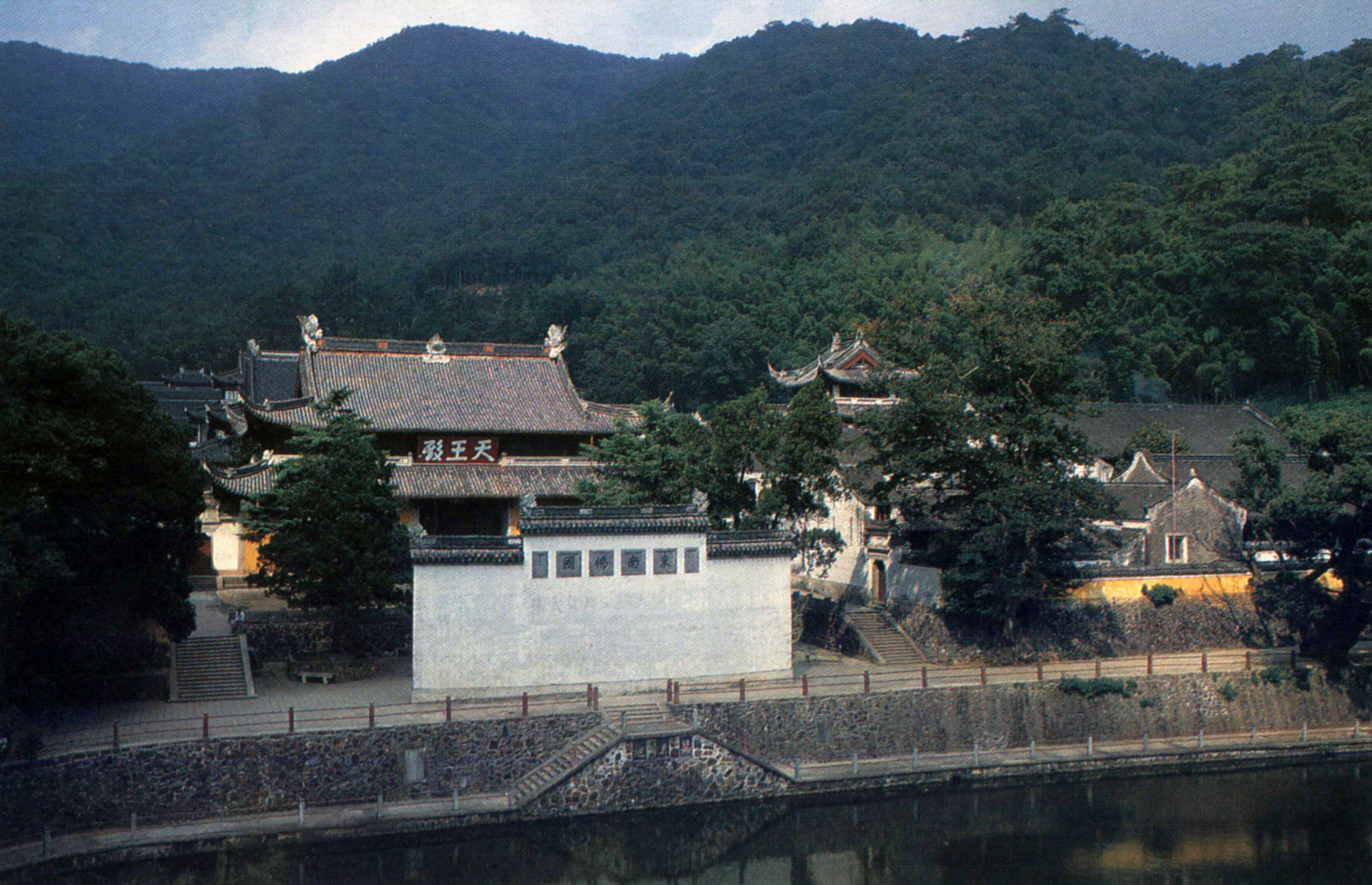
- Tiantong Temple

- Location within Zhejiang Location within China

Religion
- Affiliation: Buddhism
- Sect: Chan Buddhism

Location
- Location: Taibai Mountain, Yinzhou District, Ningbo, Zhejiang
- Country: China
- Interactive map of Tiantong Temple
- Coordinates: 29°47′37″N 121°46′49″E

Architecture
- Founder: monk Yi Xing (義興)
- Completed: AD 300

Tiantong Temple (Chinese: 天童寺; pinyin: Tiāntóngsì) is a Buddhist temple located in Taibai Mountain of Yinzhou District, Ningbo, Zhejiang, in the People's Republic of China. The temple covers a total area of 76,400 square metres (822,000 sq ft), with more than 38,800 square metres (418,000 sq ft) of floor space. Tiantong Temple is listed as one of the "Five Chan Buddhism Temples". Tiantong Temple is the cradle of the Sōtō school (曹洞宗, Sōtō-shū) of Japanese Buddhism.

== History ==
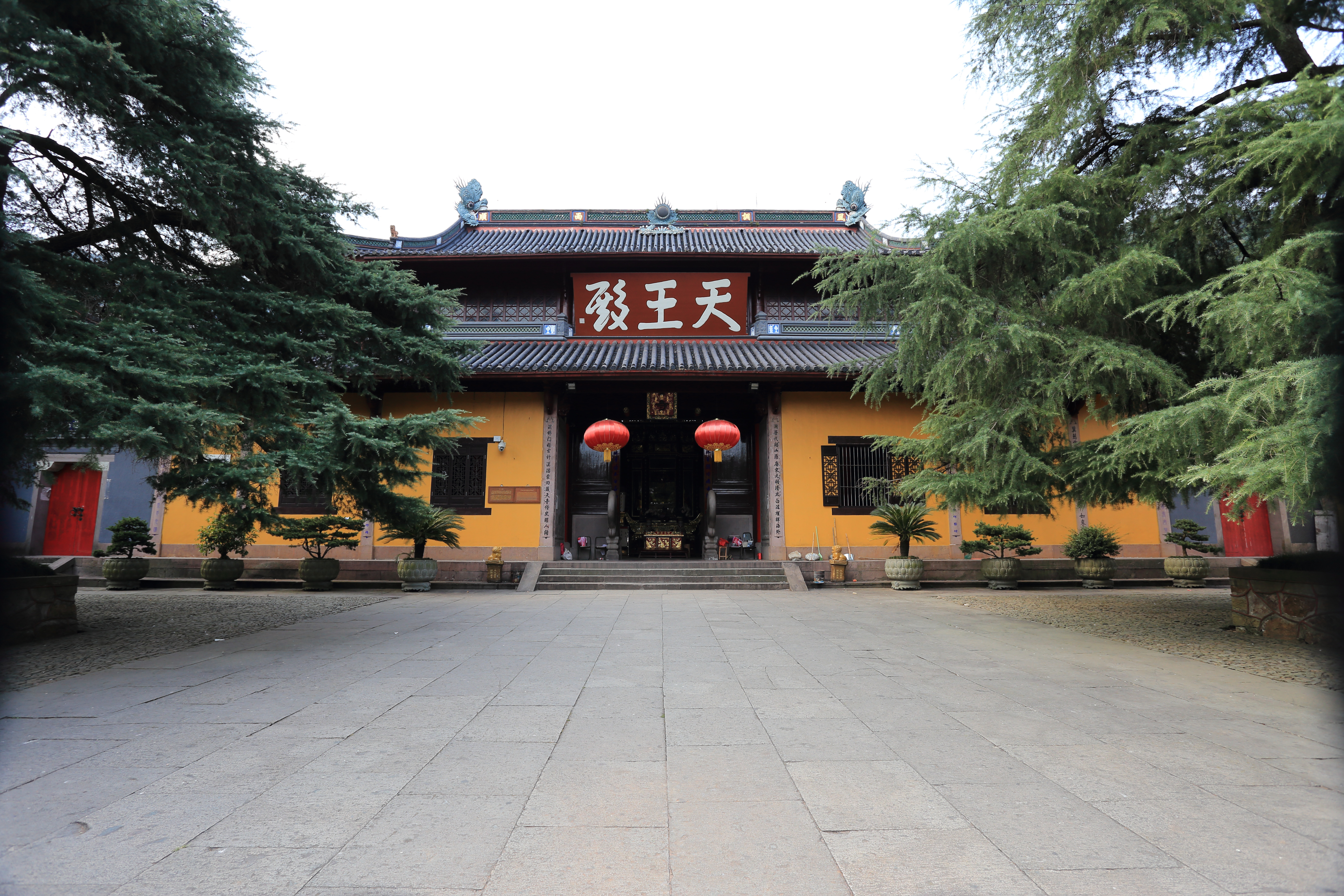
The Hall of Four Heavenly Kings.

=== Jin dynasty ===
Tiantong Temple was first established by monk Yixing (義興) in 300, in the first year of the age of Yongkang of Emperor Hui of Jin.

=== Tang dynasty ===
In 732, in the twentieth year of the age of Kaiyuan of Emperor Xuanzong, monk Fa Xuan (法璇) rebuilt it in the mountain valley, and named it "Taibai Jingshe" (太白精舍).

In 757, in the second year of the age of Zhide of Emperor Suzong, monk Zong Bi (宗弼) and Xian Cong (縣聰) removed the temple to the foot of Taibai Peak. Two years later, the Emperor gave the name "Tiantong Linglong Temple" (天童玲瓏寺).

In 841, in the first year of the age of Huichang of Emperor Wenzong, monk Jing (鏡禪師) extended the Temple.

In 869, in the tenth year of the age of Xiantong of Emperor Yizong, the Emperor gave the name "Tianshou Temple" (天壽寺).

=== Song dynasty ===
In 1007, in the fourth year of the age of Jingde of Emperor Zhenzong, the Emperor named it "Tiantong Jingde Chan Temple" (天童景德禪寺).

In 1085, in the eighth year of the age of Yuanfeng of Emperor Shenzong, the Emperor bestowed a golden kasaya on its abbot Wei Bai (惟白).

In 1101, in the first year of the age of Jianzhong Jingguo of Emperor Huizong, the Emperor bestowed a title of "Master Fo Guo" (佛國禪師) on abbot Wei Bai.

In 1129, in the third year of the age of Jianyan of Emperor Gaozong, monk Zheng Jue (正覺) became its abbot, he settled there, where he taught Chan Buddhism for 30 years, the temple had more than 1,000 monks. In 1134, in the fourth year of the age of Shaoxing of Emperor Gaozong, a monk's hall which can accommodate thousands of people was built.

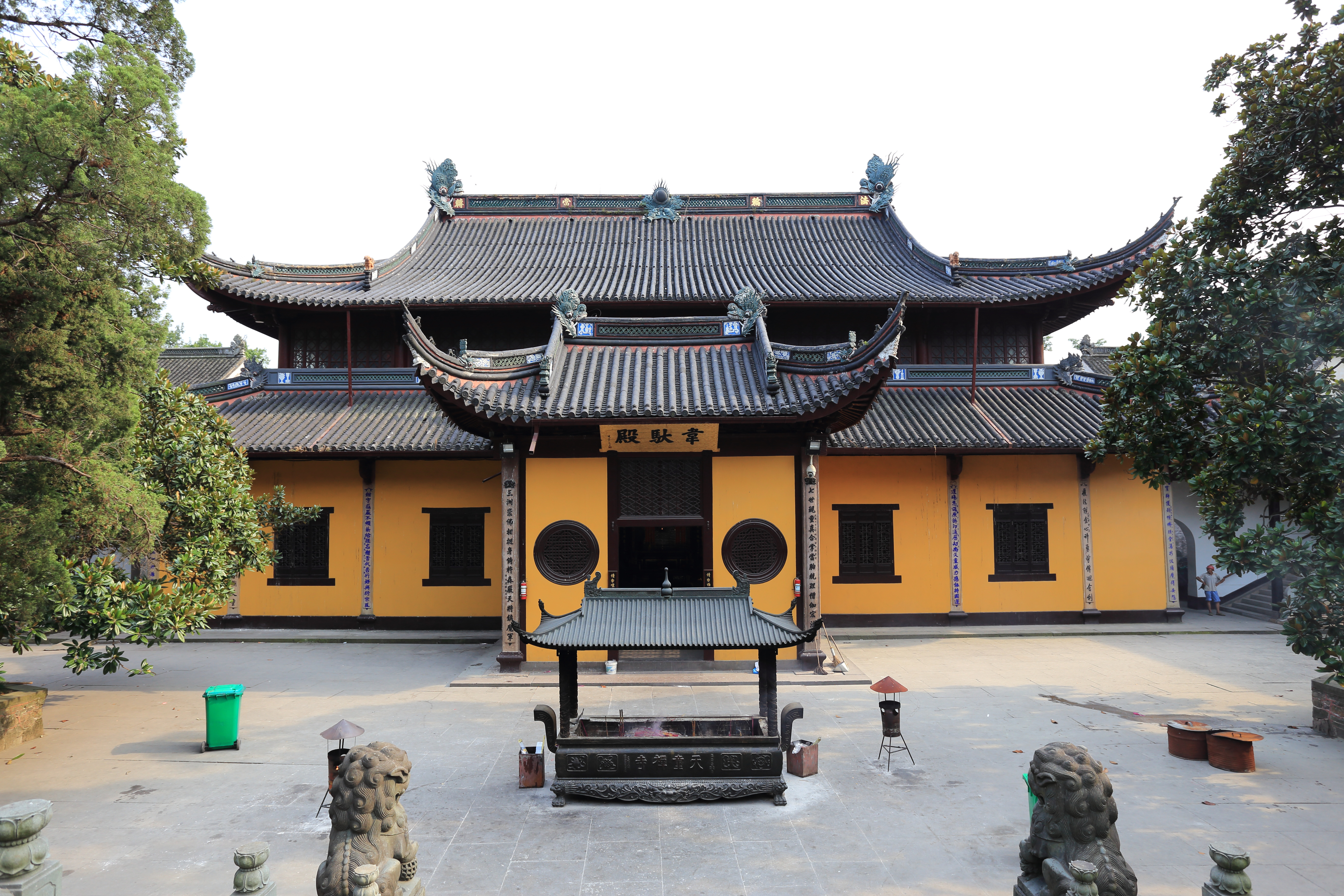
The Hall of Skanda.

In 1193, in the fourth year of the age of Shaoxi of Emperor Guangzong, the Gallery of A Thousand Buddhas was built by monk Xu An (虛庵).

In the period of the Emperor Ningzong (1208 - 1224), Tiantong Temple was ranked third among the "Five Mountains and Ten Temples" (五山十剎).

=== Yuan dynasty ===
In 1301, in the third year of the age of Dade of Temür Khan, the Gallery of A Thousand Buddhas was renamed "Chaoyuan Baoge" (朝元寶閣) by the Emperor.

In 1359, in the nineteenth year of the age of Zhizheng of Toghon Temür, abbot Yuan Liang (元良) restored the "Chaoyuan Baoge". One year later, the Emperor bestowed a title of "Shanjue Puguang Xiangshi" (善覺普光祥師) on him.

=== Ming dynasty ===
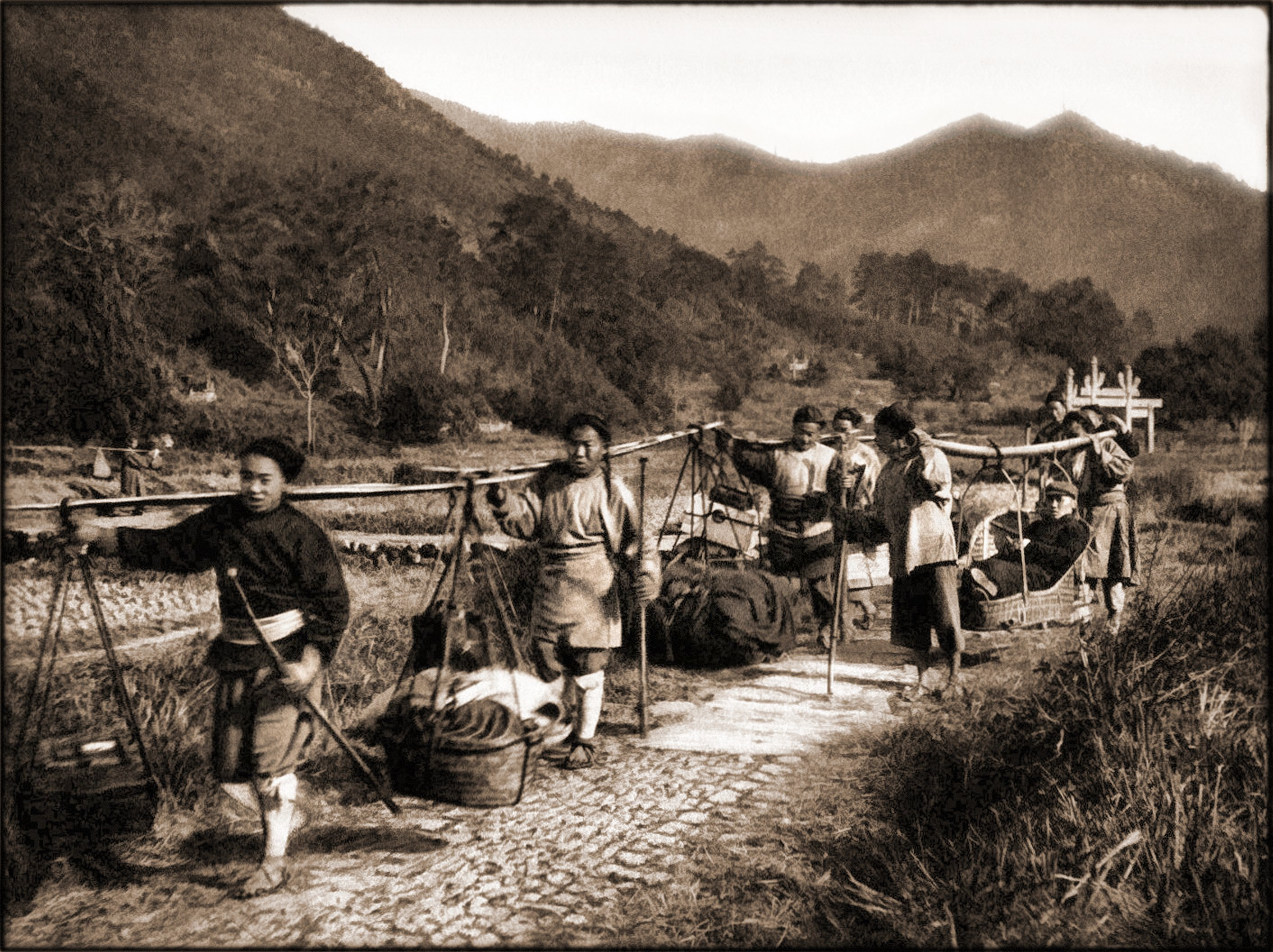
Carrying supplies to the temple with shoulder poles. 1906

In 1382, in the fifteenth year of Hongwu reign, the Emperor renamed it "Tiantong Chan Temple" (天童禪寺).

In 1587, in the fifteenth year of Wanli reign, a fire destroyed most of its buildings. That winter abbot Yin Huai (因懷) rededicated a small temple on the ruins.

During the reign of Chongzhen Emperor (1631 - 1640), the temple was completely reconstruction by abbot Mi Yun (密雲).

=== Qing dynasty ===
In 1659, in the sixteenth year of the Shunzhi reigni, the Emperor gave thousand gold pieces for reconstruction of the Buddha Hall, and bestowed a title of "Master Hongjue" (弘覺禪師) on abbot Dao Jin (道進).

In 1902, in the twenty-eighth year of Guangxu reign, abbot Jichan (寄禪) implemented the Reform System of Open Selection of Abbot.

=== Republic of China ===
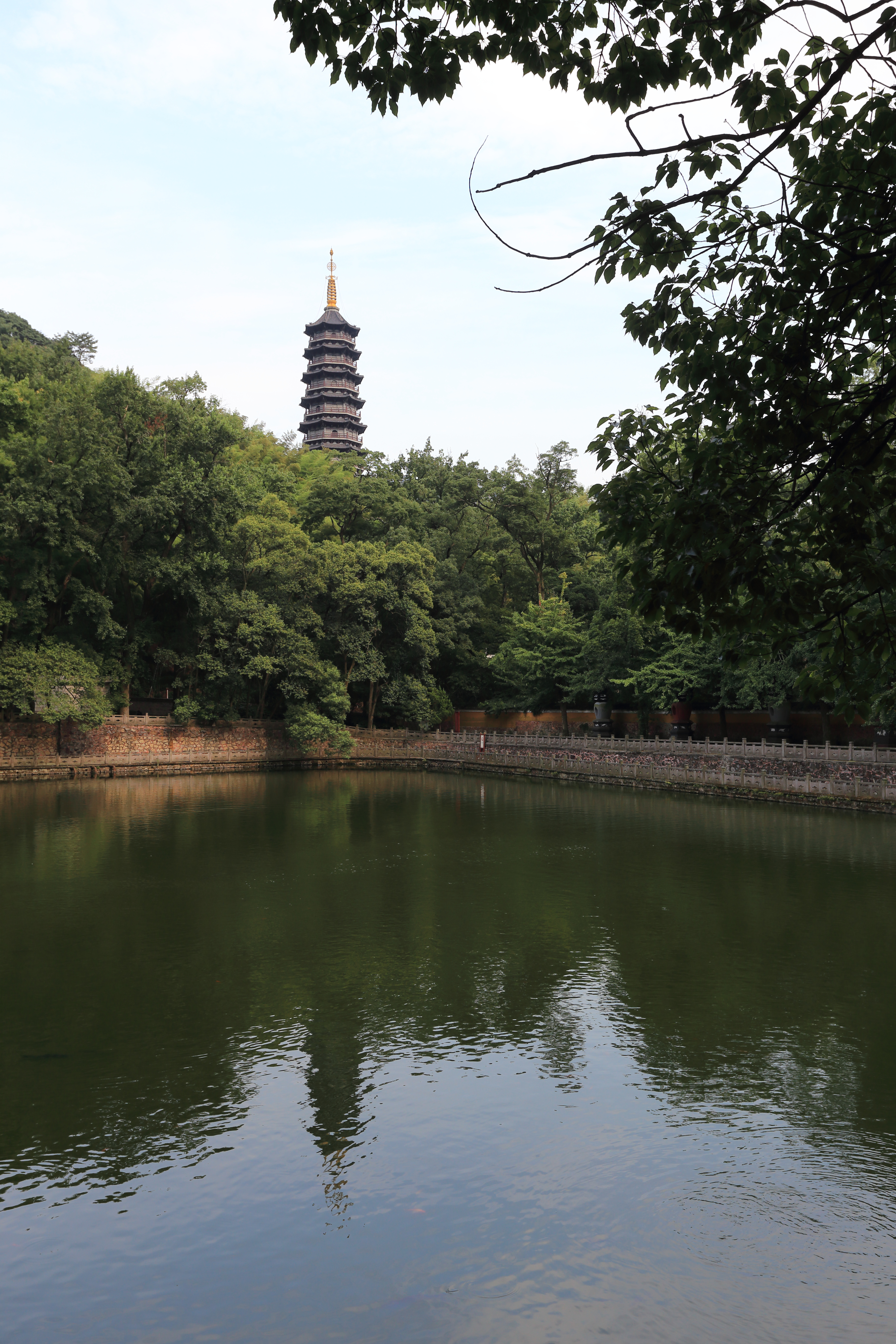
The Gallery of A Thousand Buddhas.

Master Yuan Ying was abbot of Tiantong Temple between 1930 and 1936. During his tenure, he taught Chan Buddhism there, attracted large numbers of practitioners. During the Second Sino-Japanese War, the abbot helped to organise a monastic rescue team to provide aid, providing shelter for homeless refugees and even went to Southeast Asia to raise fund.

=== People's Republic of China ===
During the Cultural Revolution, Tiantong Temple was closed for military usage and around seven hundred monastic residents were forced out of the temple, many of cultural relics was destroyed or stolen. The red guards also destroyed most of the Buddhist statues in the temple and responsible for the death of the temple's abbot.

In November 1978, the local government started to repair the badly damaged buildings.

In 1983, Tiantong Temple was designated as a "Han Area of National Key Buddhist Temples" (漢族地區佛教全國重點寺院).

In 2006, it was listed as a China's national key cultural relic preservation unit by the State Council of China.

== Architecture ==
The extant structure is based on the Ming and Qing dynasties building principles and retains the traditional architectural style. There are 700 halls and rooms in total. Now the existing main buildings include the Shanmen, Tianwang-dian, Mahavira Hall, Bell tower, Drum tower, Zushi-dian, Dharma Hall, Dining Room, and Zangjing-ge.

=== Tianwang-dian ===
The Tianwang-dian, or Hall of the Four Heavenly Kings, has double-eave gable and hip roofs covered with grey tiles. It is 23.64 metres (77.6 ft) deep, 31.77 metres (104.2 ft) wide and 19.6 metres (64 ft) high. Mi Le is enshrined in this hall, and at the back of his statue is a statue of the dharmapala Weituo. Statues of Four Heavenly Kings are enshrined in the left and right side of the hall.

=== Mahavira Hall ===
The Mahavira Hall enshrining the Three-Life Buddha, namely Shijiamouni, Amituofo and Yaoshi. The two disciple's statues are placed in front of the statue of Shijiamouni, the older is called Kassapa Buddha and the middle-aged is called Ananda. At the back of Shijiamouni's statue is the statue of Guanyin. The statues of Eighteen Arhats sitting on the seats before both sides of the gable walls.
