= Ningbo Huamao International School =

International school in Zhejiang, China

- Zhejiang; Ningbo; China

Information
- Type: Independent, International, Day and Boarding
- Established: 2006
- Principal: Ally Cao
- Employees: ~150
- Enrolment: 450 (K–12)
- Colours: Maroon, Navy, Light-Sky Blue and Gold

Ningbo Huamao International School (NBHIS, Chinese: 华茂国际学校), previously known as Multicultural Education Academy (MEA), is a school for international, expatriate students and Chinese nationals in Yinzhou district, Ningbo, Zhejiang, China. The school was founded in 2006 as the Australian International School Ningbo on the grounds of Huamao Foreign Language School in the Yinzhou District.

The school is co-educational and open to both boarding and day students. NBHIS offers three International Baccalaureate programmes PYP, MYP and DP. In October 2015 the school became a member of the Round Square Conference of Schools following Board approval at the global conference held at United World College of South East Asia (UWSEA).

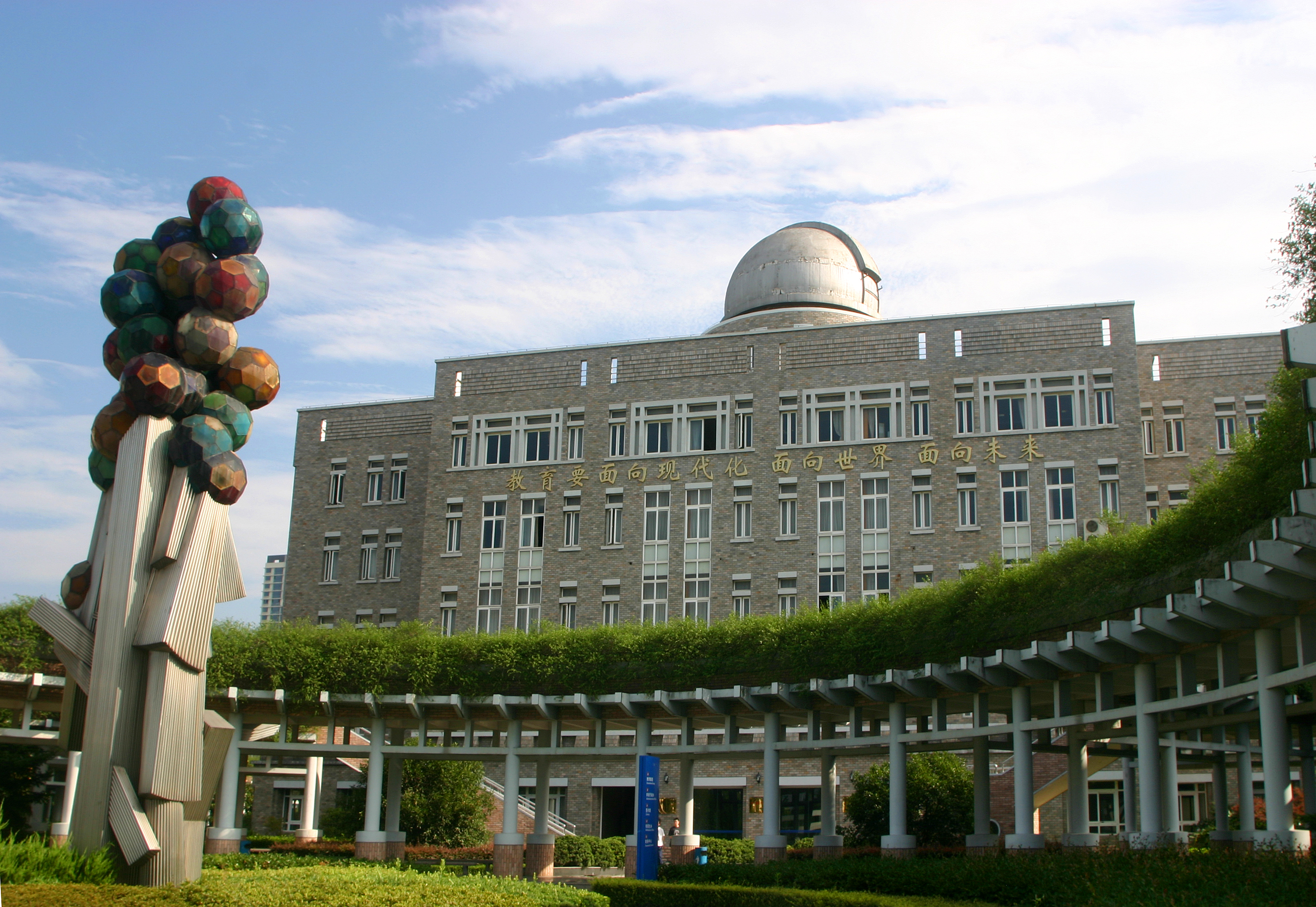
Hua Mao Administration Building

== History ==
Huamao Group purchased the international school from Denise Bradford in 2006. The school was originally known as the Australian International School Ningbo, then Huamao Multicultural Education Academy (MEA), and is now known as Ningbo Huamao International School due to a government license change that allows NBHIS to accept Chinese nationals alongside foreign nationals.

It once had up to 40 students, but by early 2008, it had shrunk to eight paying students. During that year, Hua Mao sought a western partner to assist in the management of MEA. The school signed a joint venture agreement with Mowbray International in 2008 to manage it. Paul Stephens arrived as interim principal in early 2008. Stephens remained at Hua Mao until September 2008, when the agreement was signed. Ivan Moore was the founding principal when he arrived in December 2008.

The school's joint venture with Mowbray ended in May 2012, and the Huamao Education Group took full control the following month.

The school's facilities have been renovated and expanded several times since its foundation. In 2013, an English Language Centre opened, followed by a Learning Support program in 2014. In 2017, the MYP/DP library was opened in the adjacent administrative building.

== Principals ==
Period	Details
January 2008 – September 2008	Paul Stephens (interim)
September 2008 – December 2008	Shirleyta Gerald (acting)
December 2008 – July 2015	Ivan Moore (Founding)
August 2015 – ?	Cheryl Keegan
	Maggie Ye
	Ally Cao

== Curriculum ==
NBHIS uses bilingual education. Three people teach kindergarten classes: a foreign teacher, a Chinese teacher, and an assistant. Expats and Chinese IB experienced and trained teachers teach senior school classes. Students at NBHIS begin in a bilingual pre-school environment, progress to primary school, where English is the primary language of instruction but includes strong stand-alone Chinese instruction, and then to middle school, where students continue to develop English as their primary language of instruction while protecting and extending their mother tongue. Students in the Diploma Program study English.

NBHIS launched an iPad program in 2011, and all middle and high school students bring their own laptop computers, which are required. IT is taught as part of an inquiry-based curriculum.

NBHIS is an International Baccalaureate World School, offering Primary Years Program (PYP) and Diploma Program (DP). Authorization for the PYP and DP programs was awarded in May 2012, and the school is a candidate for the Middle Years Programme (MYP).

The school emphasizes a blending Eastern and Western curriculum an ideas.
