= Dongqian Lake =

Lake in Ningbo, China

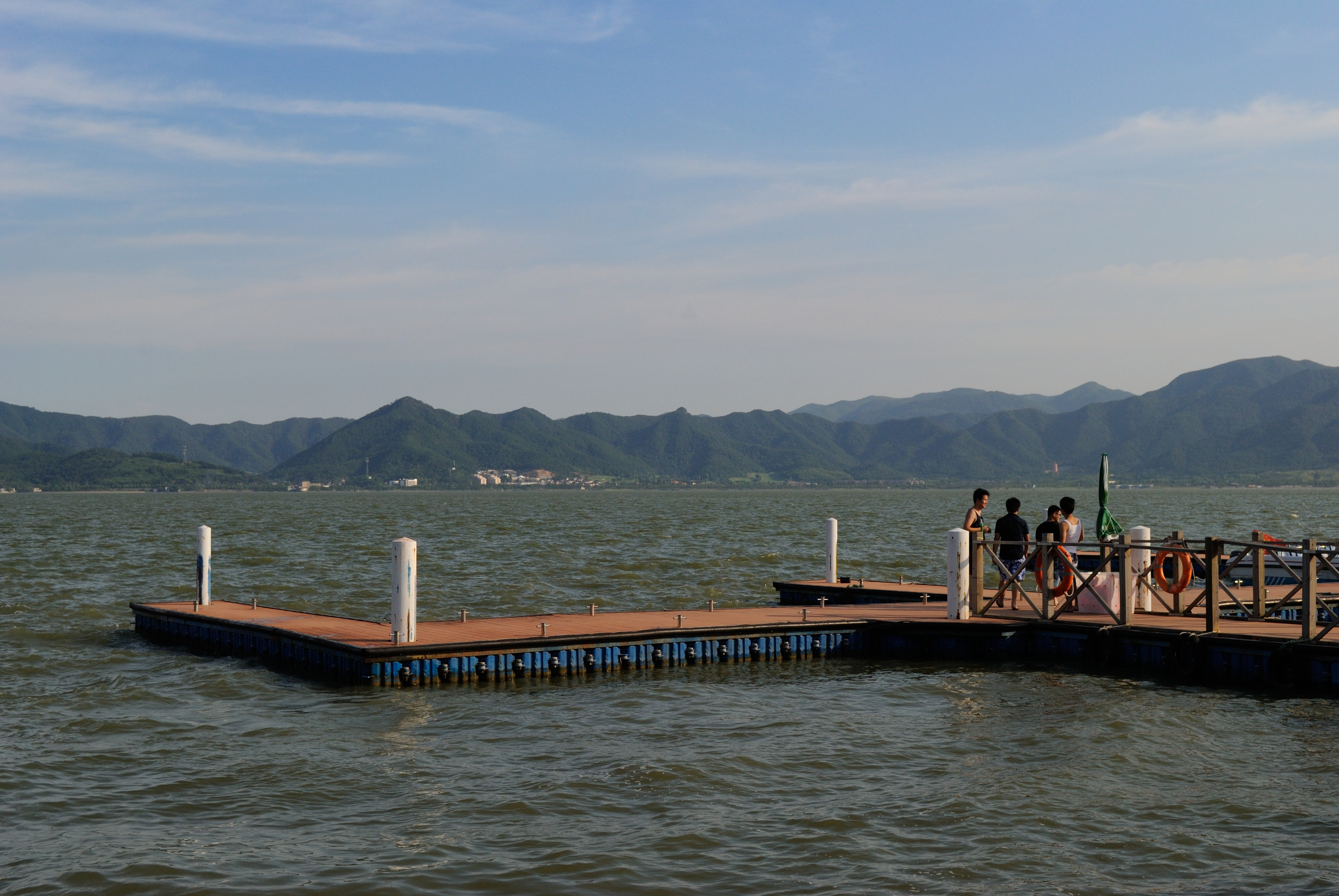
- Dongqian Lake is a long established scenic destination in China

- Location within Zhejiang
- Location: Yinzhou District, Ningbo, Zhejiang
- Coordinates: 29.7667°N 121.667°E
- Basin countries: China
- Surface area: 20 km^{2} (7.7 sq mi)

Dongqian Lake (Chinese: 东钱湖) is a large freshwater lake in Yinzhou District, Ningbo in Zhejiang, China. It has a surface area of 20 square kilometres (7.7 sq mi).
