= Yinzhou, Ningbo =

Yinzhou 鄞州区
- District
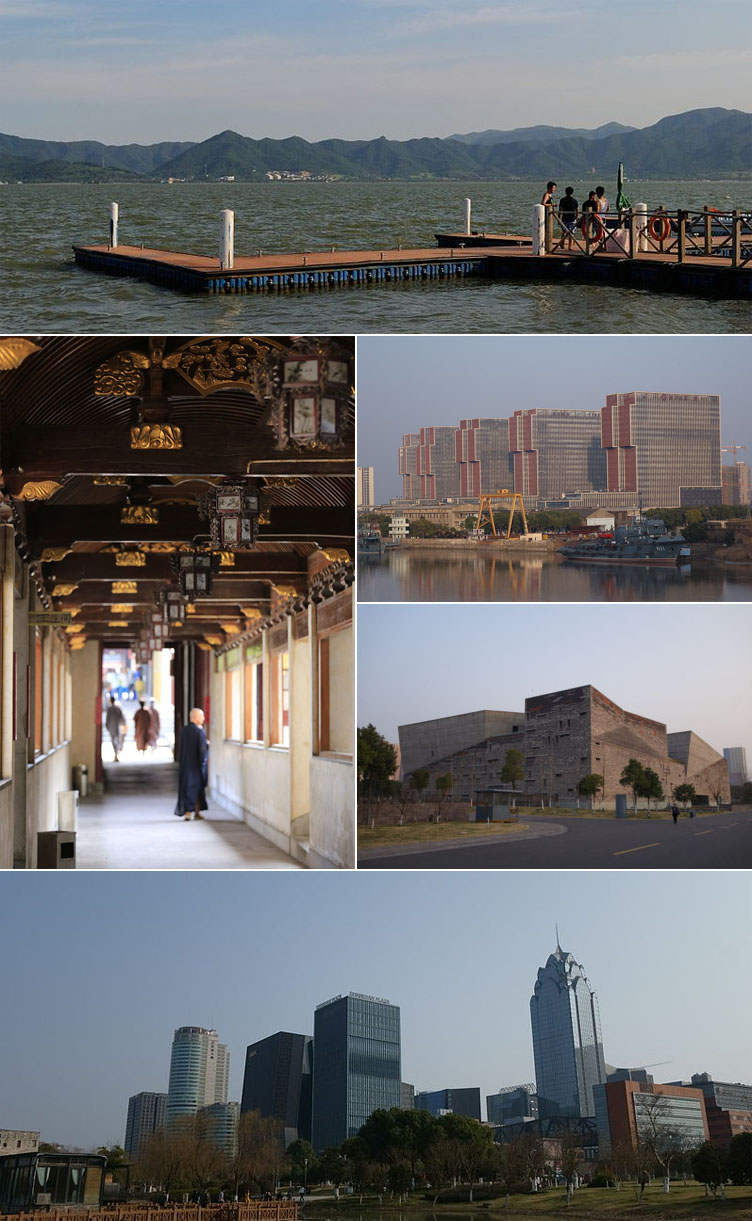
- Clockwise from the top: Dongqian Lake, Hefeng Creation Plaza, Ningbo Museum, Ningbo South Business District, Temple of King Ashoka

- Yinzhou District in Ningbo

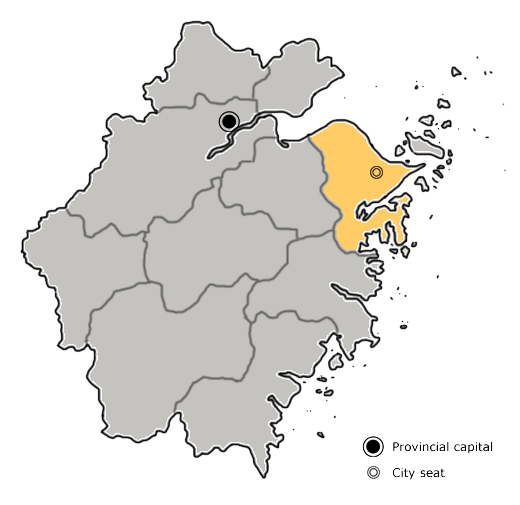
- Ningbo in Zhejiang
- Coordinates (Yinzhou District government): 29°49′02″N 121°32′48″E
- Country: People's Republic of China
- Province: Zhejiang
- Sub-provincial city: Ningbo

Area
  - Total: 801.59 km^{2} (309.50 sq mi)

Population (2016)
  - Total: 1,257,000
- Time zone: UTC+8 (China Standard)
- Website: www.nbyz.gov.cn

Yinzhou (Chinese: 鄞州; pinyin: Yínzhōu) is a district and the seat of the major city of Ningbo, Zhejiang province, China.

== History ==
In 220 BC, Qin Shi Huang, the first emperor of the Qin dynasty, established three counties called Yin (鄞), Mao (鄮) and Gouzhang (句章). Later they were merged into Gouzhang county during the Sui dynasty. It was renamed Mao county during the Tang dynasty. It had assumed its current name of "Yin" in the Five Dynasties and Ten Kingdoms period. The city of Ningbo was administrated by Yin county until after the establishment of the People's Republic of China. At the same time, Yin county became a county of Ningbo city. On April 19, 2002, it was renamed Yinzhou District. It is one of the few counties that has kept the same name since its establishment more than 2000 years ago.

== Administrative divisions ==
Subdistricts:

- Shounan Subdistrict (首南街道), Meixu Subdistrict (梅墟街道), Shiqi Subdistrict (石碶街道), Xiaying Subdistrict (下应街道), Zhonggongmiao Subdistrict (钟公庙街道), Zhonghe Subdistrict (中河街道)

Towns:

- Dongqianhu (东钱湖镇), Dongqiao (洞桥镇), Dongwu (东吴镇), Gulin (古林镇), Gaoqiao (高桥镇), Hengxi (横溪镇), Hengjie (横街镇), Jitugang (集士港镇), Jiangshan (姜山镇), Qiu'ai (邱隘镇), Tangxi (塘溪镇), Wuxiang (五乡镇), Xianxiang (咸祥镇), Yinjiang (鄞江镇), Yunlong (云龙镇), Zhanqi (瞻岐镇), Zhangshui (章水镇)

The only township is Longguan Township (龙观乡)

== Historical personalities ==
- Cheng Duanli, educator
- Tong Dizhou, embryologist

== Tourism ==
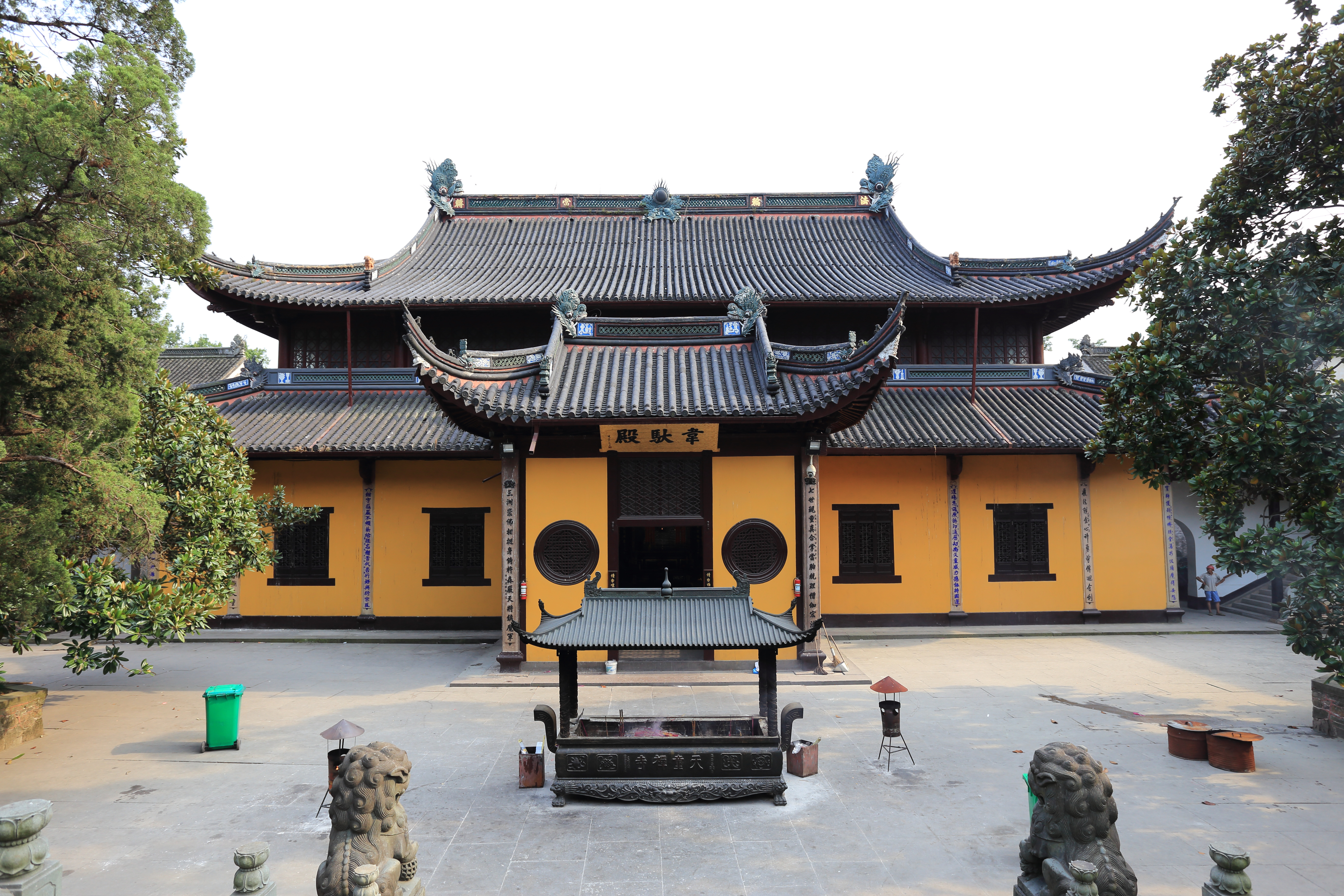
The Hall of Skanda in Tiantong Temple.

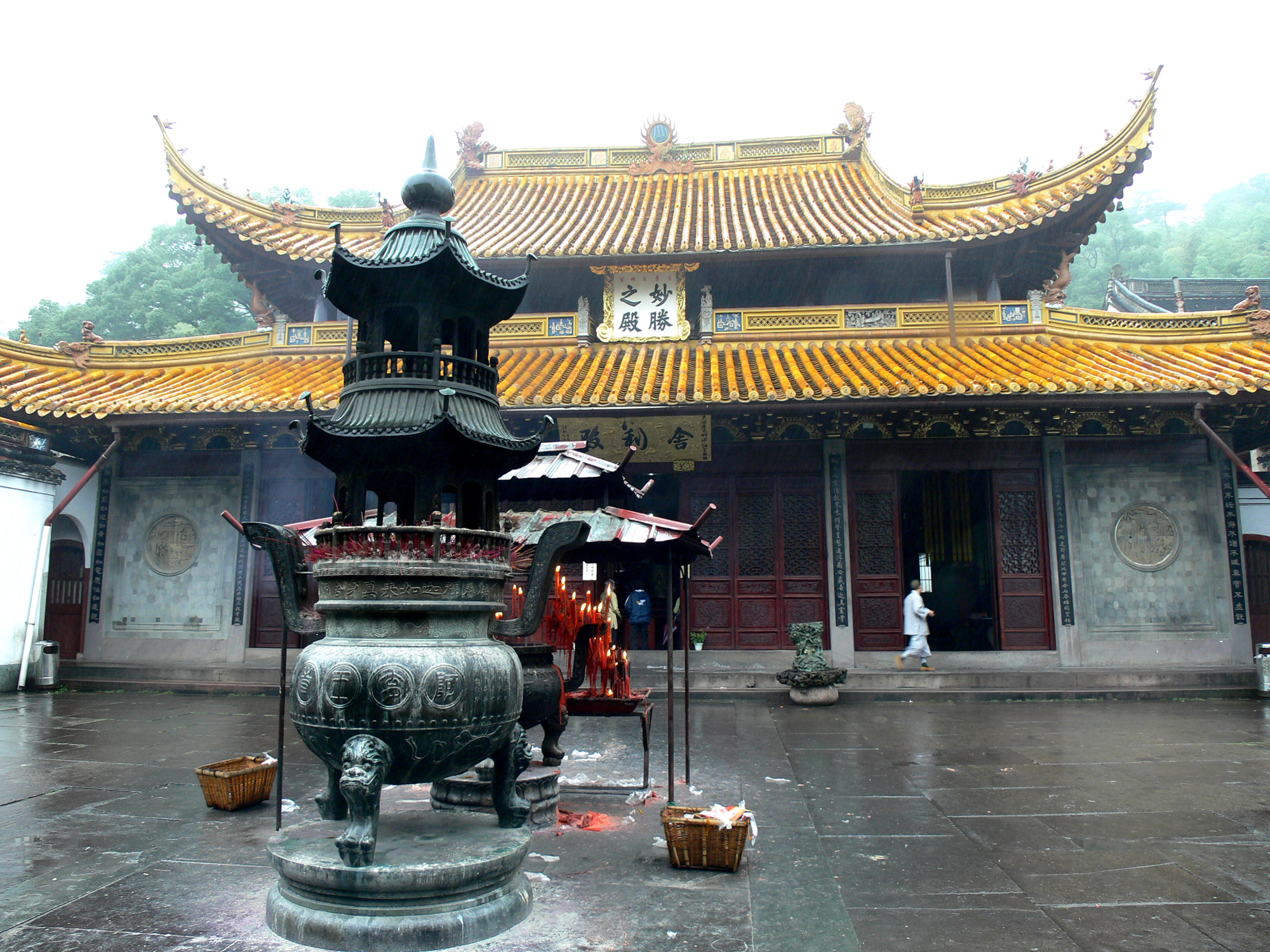
King Ashoka Temple

Ningbo Southern Business District seen from a neighboring skyscraper.

- East Zhejiang Maritime Affairs and Folk Customs Museum (浙东海事民俗博物馆), housed in a former temple of Mazu and guildhall in central Ningbo, preserves the area's rich history of traditional arts and maritime trade.
- Ningbo Museum (宁波博物馆) is designed by Wang Shu, the first Chinese citizen to win the Pritzker Architecture Prize in 2012. The museum focuses on Ningbo area history and traditional customs.
- Liangzhu Cultural Park (梁祝文化公园) was built to commemorate the beautiful love story of Liang Shanbo and Zhu Yingtai. The story is based on the Chinese legend of the Butterfly Lovers.
- Tiantong Scenic Spot (天童风景名胜区) mainly consists of Tiantong Temple and Tiantong National Forest Park. Tiantong Temple is one of the most important Chan Buddhist temples; Sōtō began its formation there under Rujing. It was originally built during the Western Jin dynasty around 300 AD (some date it between 265 and 316). It ranks second among the five sacred Chinese Zen Buddhist mountains. A very large complex of buildings, its former total of 999 rooms has now shrunk to 730 today, arranged in twenty groups of buildings rising up the mountain slope.
- Eyuwang Temple (阿育王寺) was built in A.D. 232. It is the only existing temple named after Ashoka in China.
- Dongqian Lake (东钱湖) lies in the southeast of Yinzhou District. It is the largest natural freshwater lake in Zhejiang province, with a water surface area of 20 square kilometers. Since ancient times, the Lake has been a famous scenic spot in Eastern Zhejiang.
- Romon U-Park (罗蒙环球乐园) is one of the largest urban indoor amusement parks in the world.

== Industry ==
Yinzhou District is home to more than 15,000 industrial organizations. The economy mainly consists of six sectors: light textiles, garments, machinery, electronics, automobile parts and food. In 2008, its GDP reached RMB 65.08 billion yuan and per capita GDP reached RMB 82,052 yuan (US$11,815). Its imports and exports totaled US$1.44 billion and US$6.6 billion, respectively.

== Economy ==
Ningbo Southern Business District ("Ningbo CBD") is located in the district. AUX Group and Yinzhou Bank are based in Yinzhou district.

== Education ==
Ningbo Higher Education Zone (宁波高等教育园区) is located at the south of Yinzhou District. Educational institutions located in the Higher Educational Zone:

- Ningbo Institute of Technology
- University of Nottingham Ningbo China
- Yinzhou Education Center
- Zhejiang University and Ningbo University Hygiene Vocational School
- Zhejiang Wanli University

International schools in Yinzhou:

- HD Ningbo School Yinzhou Campus
- Ningbo Huamao International School
