= Dongqiao, Ningbo =

Dongqiao 洞桥镇
- Town
- Dongqiao Bridge
- Interactive map of Dongqiao
- Coordinates: 29°46′47″N 121°24′48″E
- Country: People's Republic of China
- Province: Zhejiang
- Sub-provincial city: Ningbo
- District: Yinzhou
- Time zone: UTC+8 (China Standard)
- Area code: 0574

Dongqiao (simplified Chinese: 洞桥; traditional Chinese: 洞橋; pinyin: Dòngqiáo; Ningbo dialect: don^{3}jio^{1}), is a town in Yinzhou District, Ningbo, Zhejiang, People's Republic of China. Located in the southwestern suburbs of the city, it is roughly 5 kilometres (3.1 mi) southwest of Ningbo Lishe International Airport. There are many factories in the area, including a plastic factory in Shagang Village.

== Administrative divisions ==
As of 2011, Dongqiao has 1 residential community (社区) and 20 villages under its administration:

- Mingyuan (明苑社区)
- Shijiumiao (石臼庙村)
- Shagang (沙港村)
- Wangjiaqiao (王家桥村)
- Shangshuiqi (上水碶村)
- Shangling (上凌村)
- Sunwang (孙王村)
- Lijia (李家村)
- Chengjia(程家村)
- Dongqiao (洞桥村)
- Huijiang (蕙江村)
- Luojiacao (罗家漕村)
- Panjiaqi (潘家耷村)
- Zhangjiadian (张家垫村)
- Qianwang (前王村)
- Shuqiao (树桥村)
- Zhougongzhai (周公宅村)
- Bailiangqiao (百梁桥村)
- Xuanpei (宣裴村)
- Yushantou (鱼山头村)
- Sanli (三李村)

== See also ==
- List of township-level divisions of Zhejiang
