= Longguan Township =

Longguan Township 龙观乡
- Township
- Interactive map of Longguan Township
- Coordinates: 29°46′03″N 121°18′56″E
- Country: People's Republic of China
- Province: Zhejiang
- Sub-provincial city: Ningbo
- District: Yinzhou
- Elevation: 10 m (33 ft)
- Time zone: UTC+8 (China Standard)
- Area code: 0574

Longguan Township (simplified Chinese: 龙观乡; traditional Chinese: 龍觀鄉; pinyin: Lóngguān Xiāng) is a township in Yinzhou District, Ningbo, People's Republic of China, situated in a valley about 25 kilometres (16 mi) southwest of downtown Ningbo. As of 2011, it has one residential community (社区) and 10 villages under its administration.

== See also ==
- List of township-level divisions of Zhejiang
