= Skanda (Buddhism) =

Guardian of Buddhist monasteries

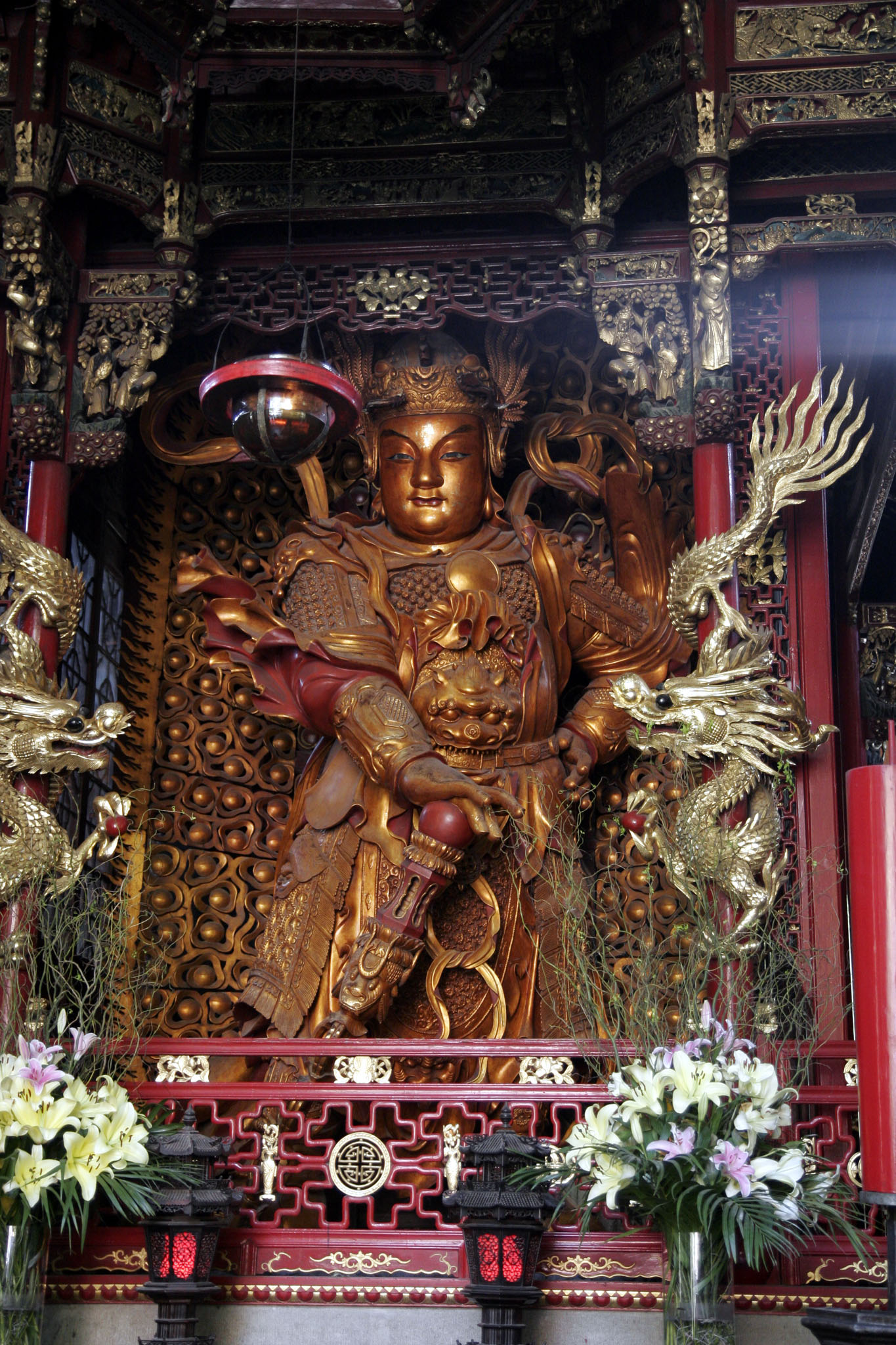
- Statue of Weituo (Skanda) in Lingyin temple in Hangzhou, Zhejiang, China.
- Chinese: 韋馱天 (Pinyin: Wéituó Tiān) 韋馱菩薩 (Pinyin: Wéituó Púsà)
- Japanese: 韋馱天(いだてん) (Romaji: Idaten)
- Korean: 위타천 (RR: Wita Cheon)
- Mongolian: Арван Хоёр Нууд
- Tagalog: Skanda
- Thai: พระเวทโพธิสัตว์ RTGS: phra wet phothisat
- Tibetan: གདོང་དྲུག་ Wylie: gdong drug
- Vietnamese: Vi Đà Bồ Tát; Hộ Pháp Chư Tôn Bồ Tát

Information
- Venerated by: Theravada, Mahāyāna, Vajrayāna

Skanda (Chinese: 塞建陀, 室建陀), also known as Weituo (Chinese: 韋馱) and Idaten (Japanese: 韋駄天), is a Mahayana bodhisattva regarded as a devoted guardian of Buddhist monasteries who protects the teachings of Buddhism. He is also sometimes called in the Chinese tradition "Hufa Weituo Zuntian Pusa", meaning "Honored Dharma Protector Weituo Bodhisattva", because he is one of the twenty-four celestial guardian deities mentioned in the Golden Light Sutra.

In Chinese temples, Weituo faces the statue of the Buddha in the main shrine, traditionally unarmed and with his hands in anjali. In others, he is on the far right of the main shrine with weapon in hand, whereas on the left is his counterpart, Qielan (personified as the historical general Guan Yu). In Chinese sutras, his image is found at the end of the sutra, a reminder of his vow to protect and preserve the teachings.

== Origins ==
According to legends, Skanda was the son of a virtuous king who had complete faith in Buddha's teachings. When the Buddha entered Nirvana, the Buddha instructed Skanda to guard the Dharma. According to the Sutra of Golden Light, a demon stole the Buddha’s ashes, and it was Skanda who chased him to the summit of Mount Meru to retrieve the sacred relics. Skanda's vow of protecting the faith and Dharma was proven when he managed to defeat the evil demons and return the relics. He is thus associated with extraordinary speed and came to be regarded as a protector of monasteries and the Sangha, as well as warding off fire and theft.

== Legends ==
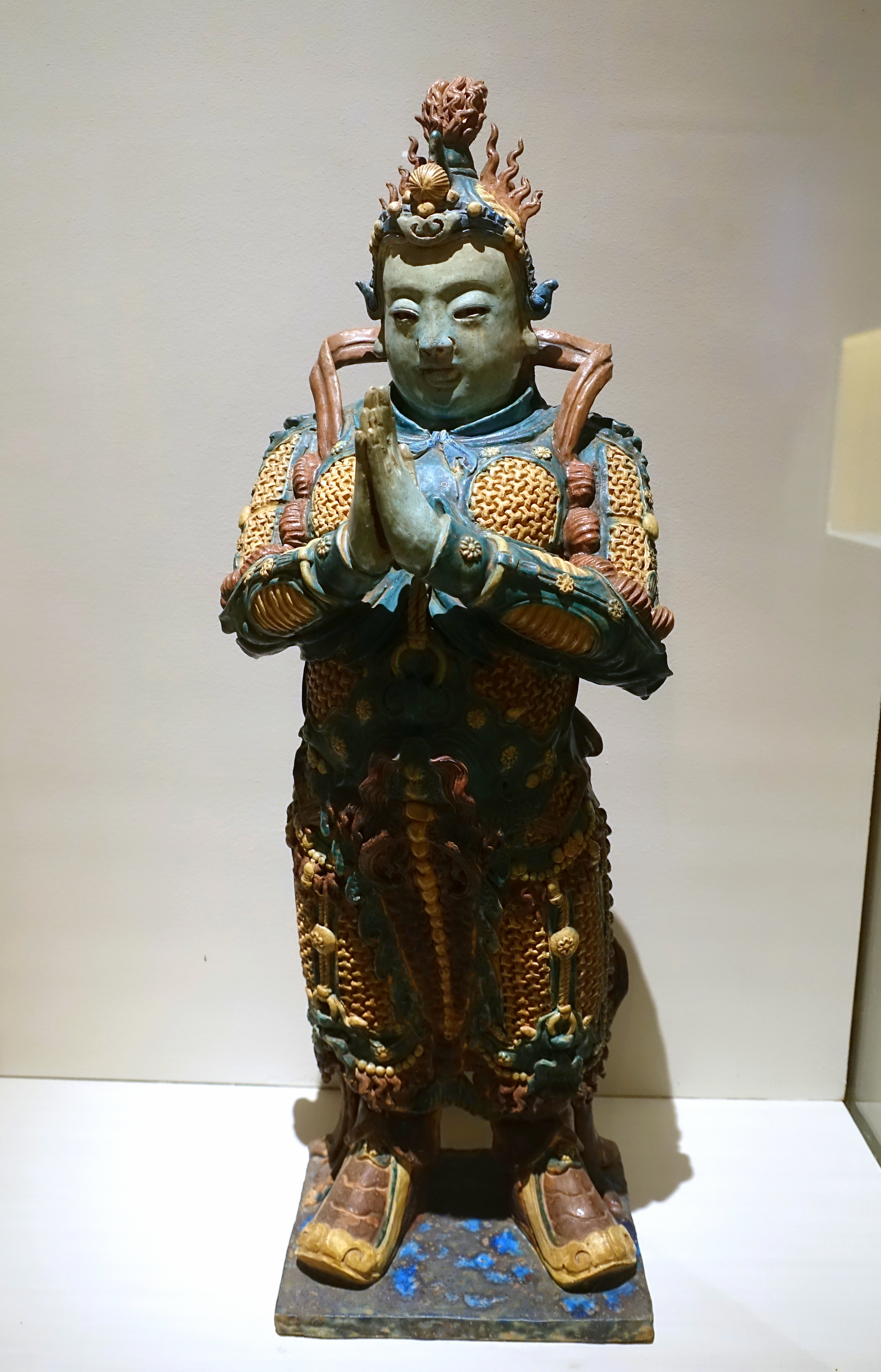
Stone statue of Weituo in mountain pattern armour, Ming dynasty, 1527

Stories vary on how Weituo was accepted into the traditional Chinese Buddhist pantheon. Some have proposed that Weituo's features were adapted from a Chinese deity who appeared in the Chinese classical Ming novel Fengshen Yanyi. However, the existence of illustrated Weituo images predating the Ming Dynasty set his origins back to an earlier period in the development of Chinese Buddhism.

Weituo is described as a young man fully clad in the armor and headgear of a Chinese general, and is usually leaning on a vajra staff. Some say that Weituo is the Hindu war god Kartikeya (Murugan) himself, who bears the name Skanda. Others point out that Weituo might also be a manifestation of Vajrapani, a bodhisattva who bears some relations to Weituo because they both wield vajras as weapons, are portrayed with flaming halos, and are both heavenly protectors of Buddhism.

Although Weituo is only a deva, he is very often addressed as a bodhisattva.

=== As Miao Shan's lover ===
According to an account in a Ming dynasty text, the Xiangshan Baojuan (香山寶卷; lit: "Precious Scroll of Fragrant Mountain"), the Bodhisattva Guanyin (Avalokitesvara) was said to have once reincarnated as the princess Miao Shan and Weituo was one of her cruel father's generals. He loved Miao Shan but realized he could not possibly be a proper partner to her, since she was a pure person. However, Weituo was inspired by Miao Shan's kindness so he decided to stay faithful and devoted to Miao Shan, even if she was not his wife. The two escaped Miao Shan's father, and the general-suitor helped build Miao Shan a temple and a kingdom of her own. Soon, however, the cruel king found them and killed them both. The general, because of his devotion to Guanyin, transformed into a bodhisattva himself, who vowed to always serve and protect Guanyin. His appearance as a Chinese general is the direct forebear to his connection with Miao Shan.

=== As a warrior ===
Another story says that Miao Shan was told to commit suicide by her grandmother. Her grandmother forced Miao Shan to leap into the sea because she was thought to have been an incarnation of a demon, when in fact she was not. The emperor told a loyal soldier named Luo Ping to pretend to throw Miao Shan into the ocean. He brought her with Yin Ma, the mother of Weituo, to her village. Years passed, when an evil fish demon came. A disloyal soldier named Huo Yi was sent by the fish demon to kill Miao Shan. The fish demon wanted revenge on Miao Shan because she was the incarnation of Ci Hang Da Shi, a Buddhist deva that put the fish in a lotus pond. Huo Yi and his troops went to the village where Miao Shan and WeiTio lived and fought. Huo Yi's son killed Weituo. After Miao Shan became the bodhisattva Guanyin, she made Weituo a bodhisattva guardian. He became a bodhisattva because he took care of Miao Shan and loved her as a sister.

According to the lunar calendar, his birthday is the 3rd day of the 6th lunar month.

== Gallery ==
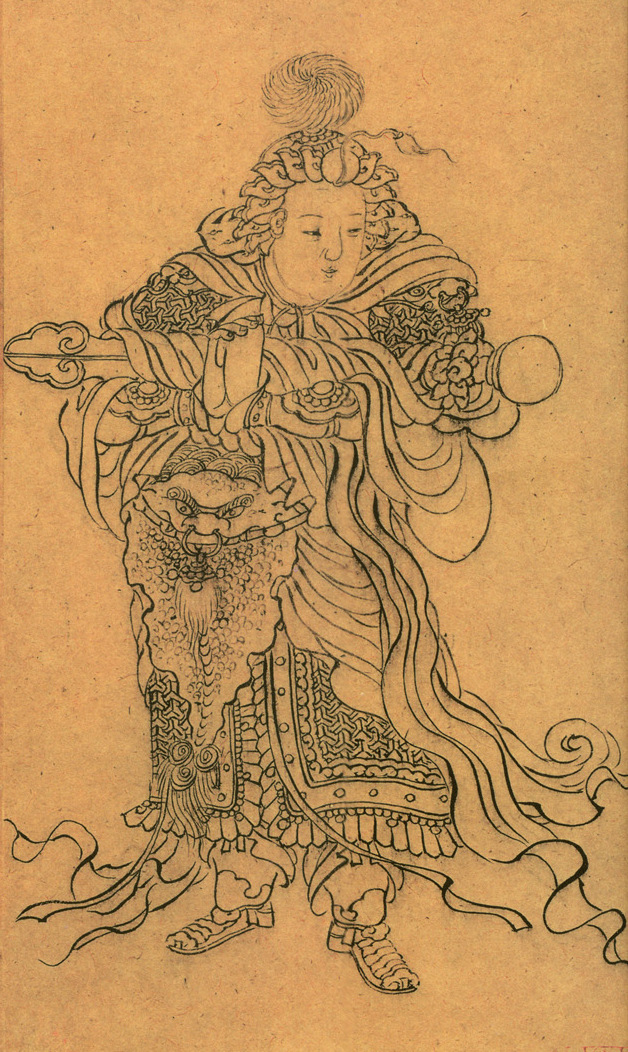
Weituo as portrayed by the Chinese artist Zhao Mengfu during the Yuan dynasty (1271-1368).

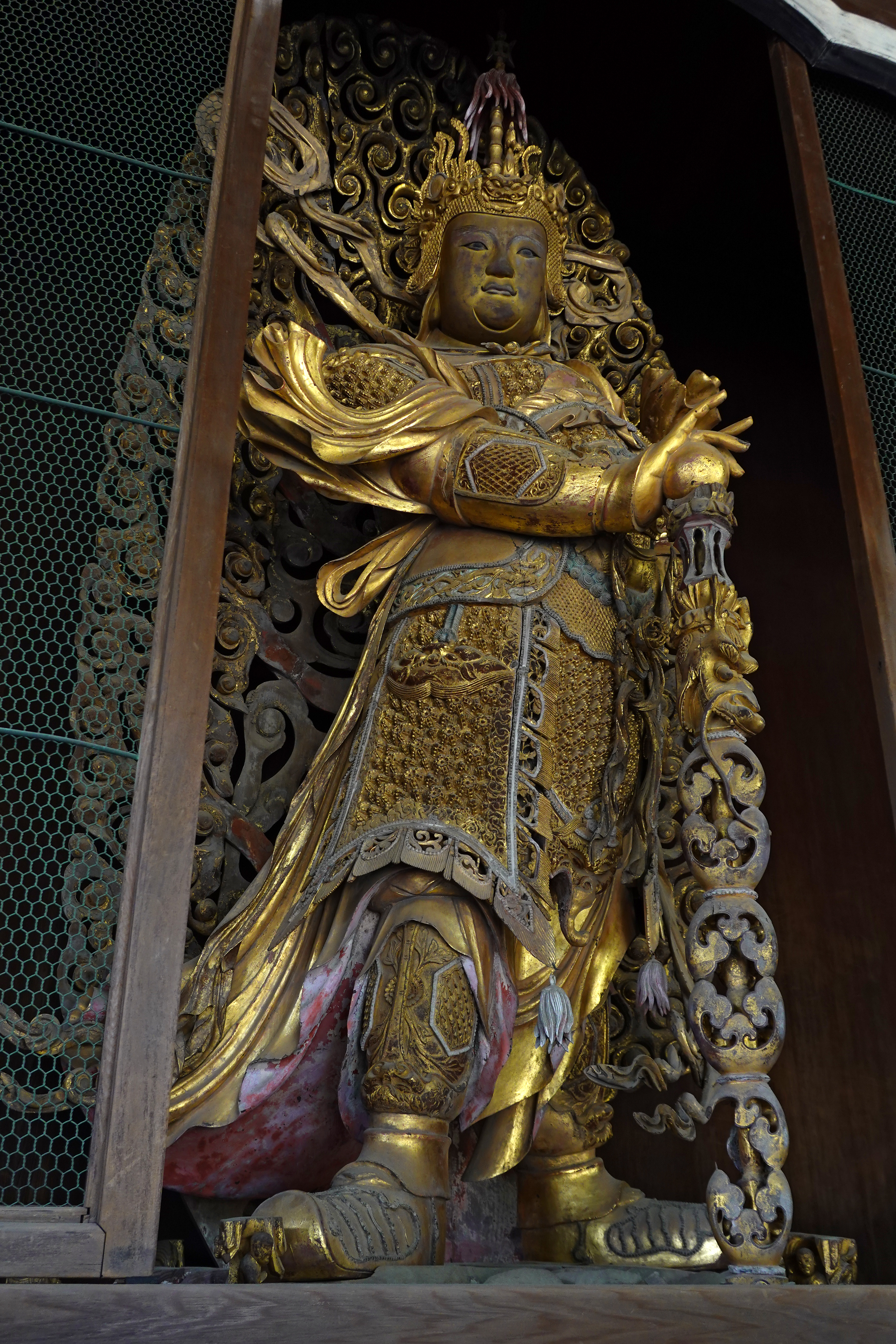
Statue of Idaten at the Idaten in the Tennō-den of Manpuku-ji in Uji, Kyoto, Japan.

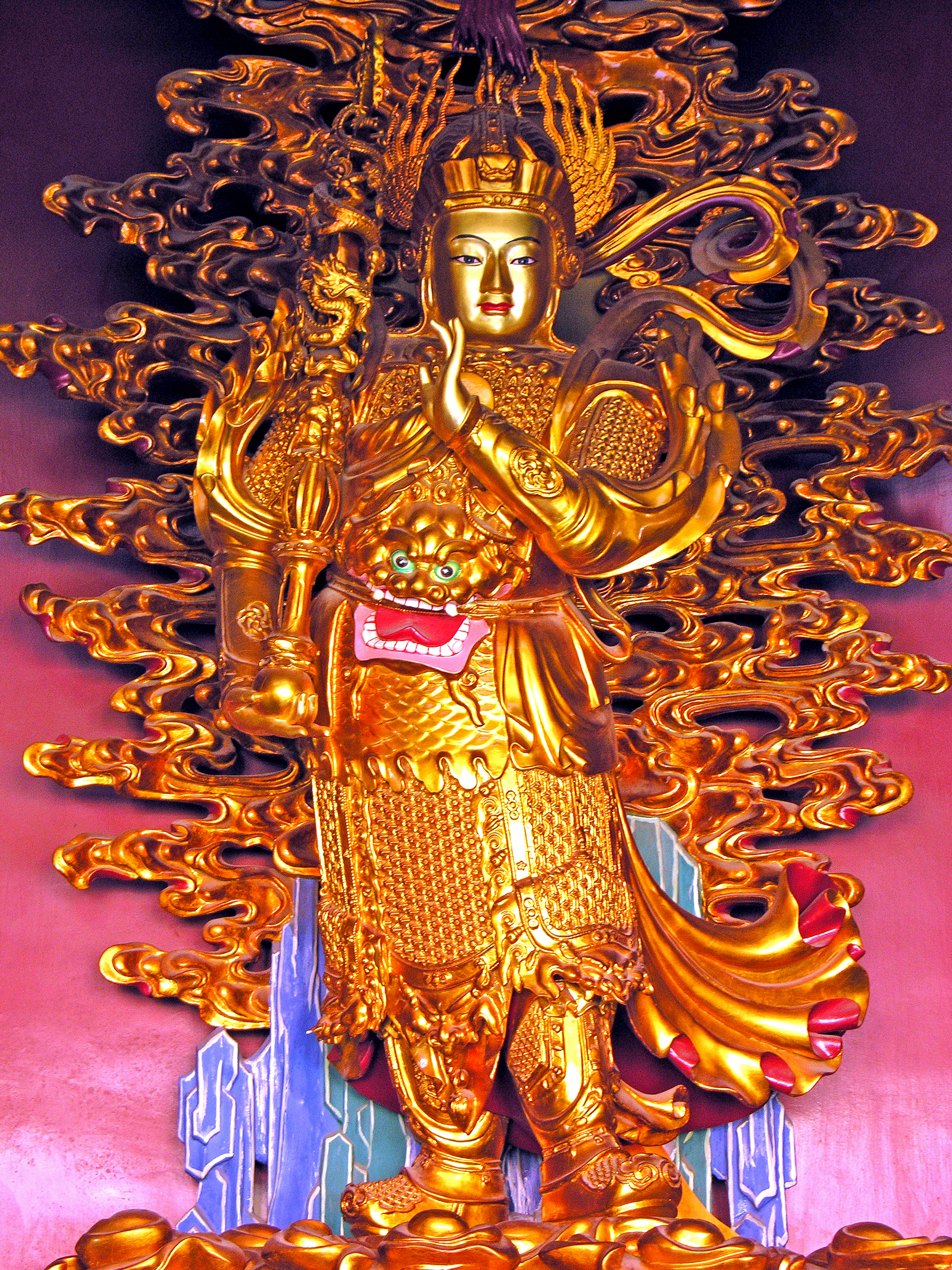
Statue of Weituo at the Tianwang-dian of Yonghe Temple in Beijing, China.

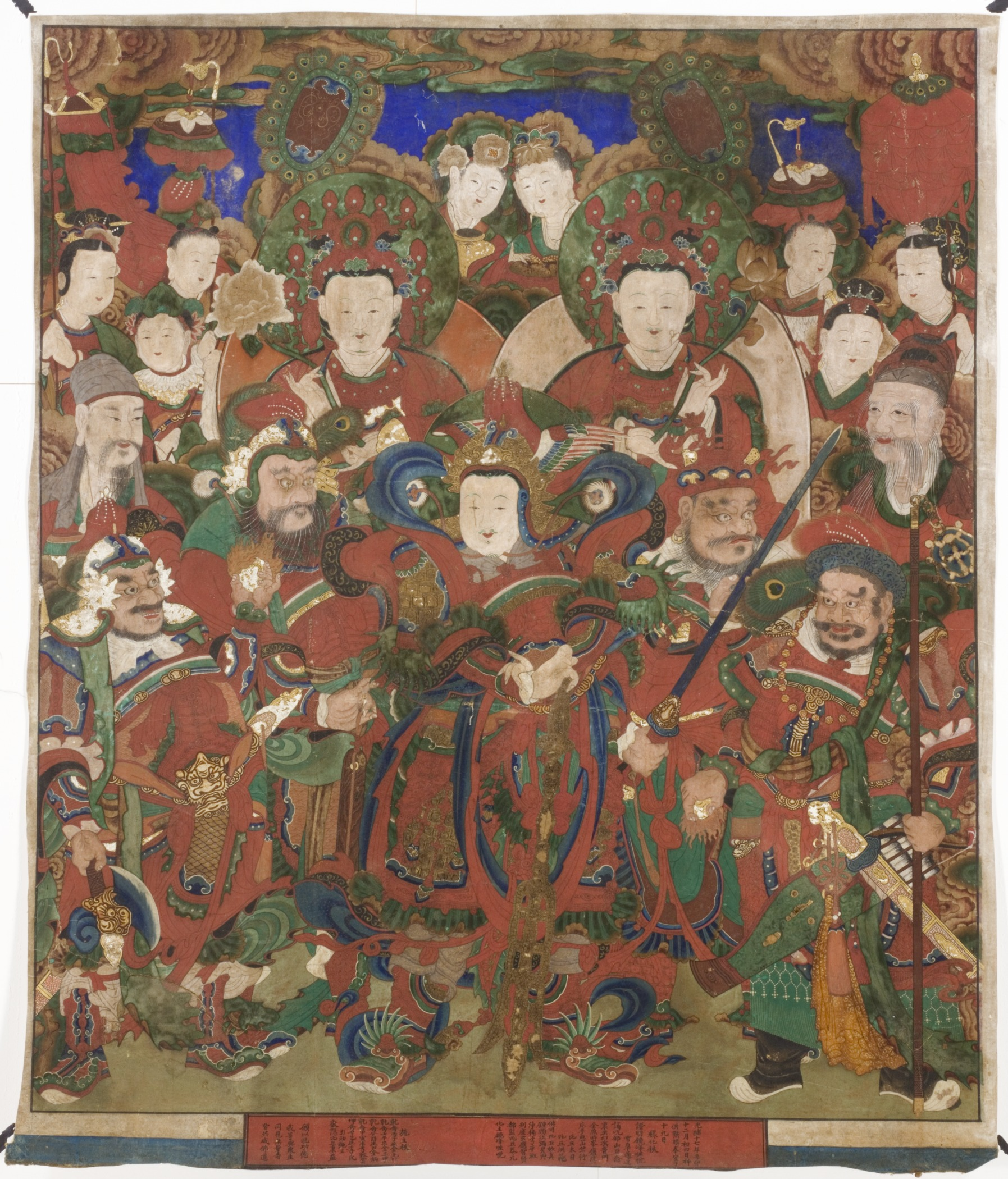
Joseon dynasty (1392-1910) Korean painting of Witaecheon (Skanda) with Jeseokcheon (Śakra), Beomcheon (Brahma) and guardians and attendants. Dated 1891.

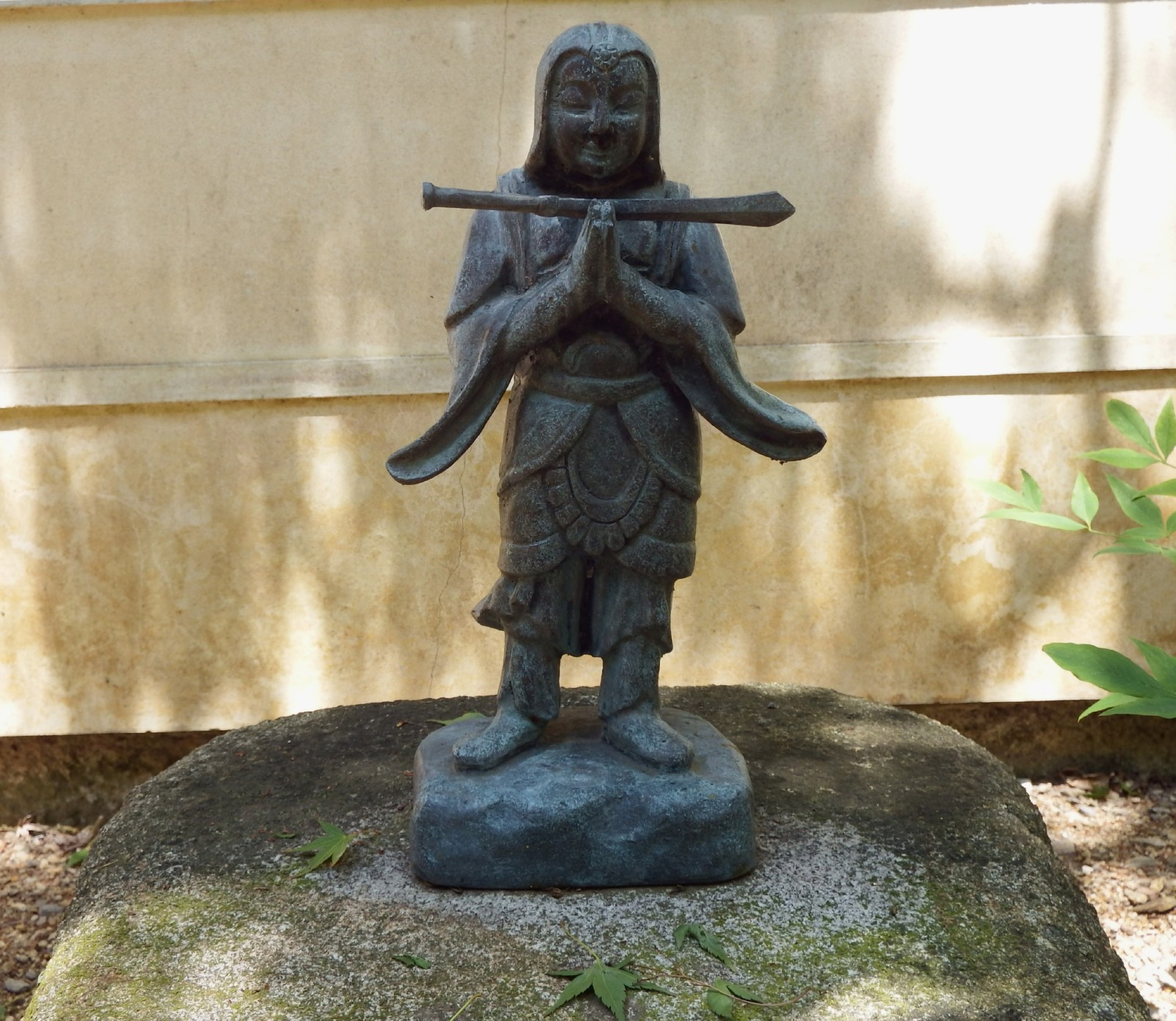
Statue of Idaten at Shiromine-ji in Sakaide, Kanagawa, Japan.

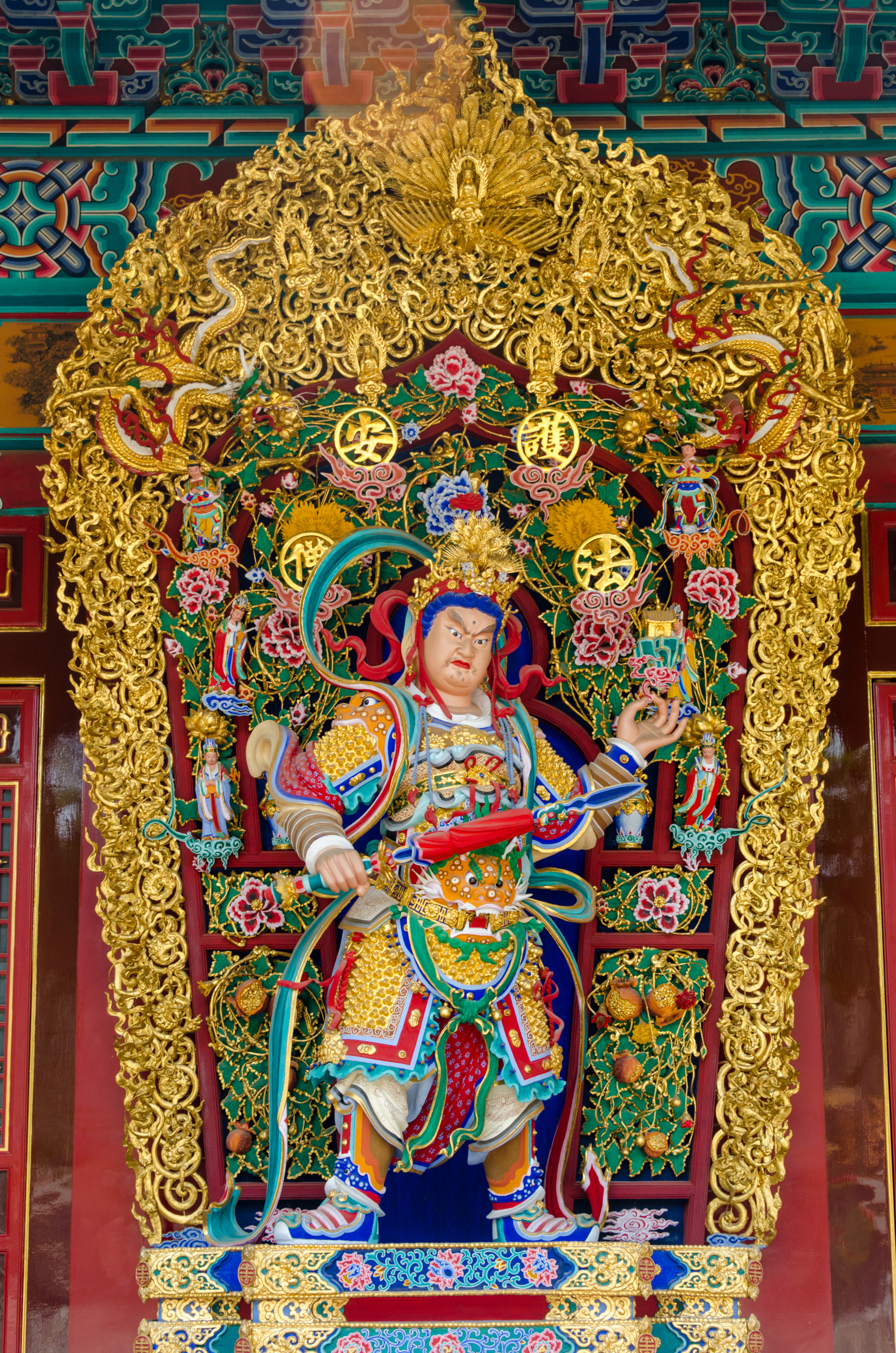
Statue of Weituo at Yuantong Temple in Kunming, Yunnan, China.

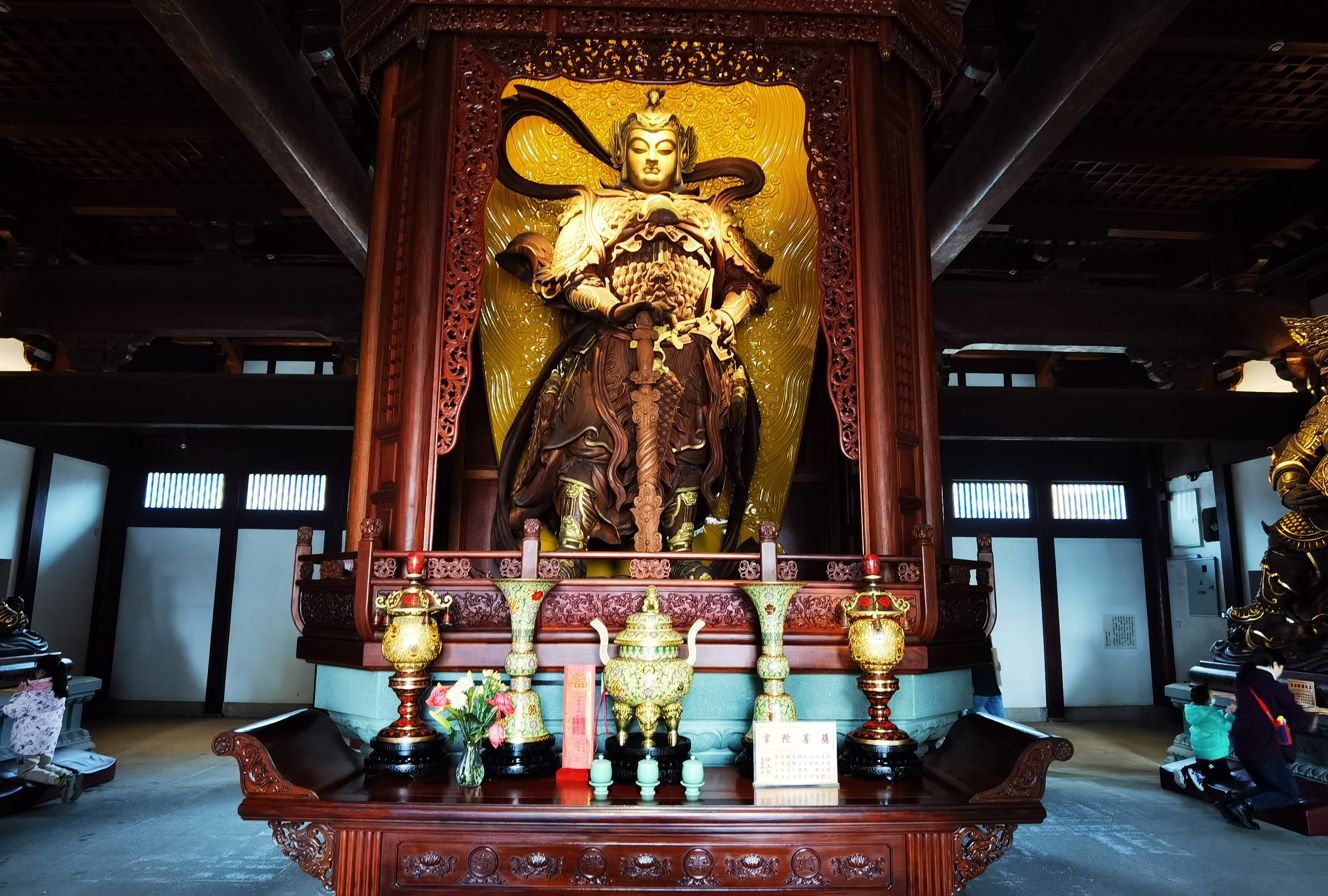
Statue of Weituo at Jingshan Temple in Kunming, Yunnan, China.

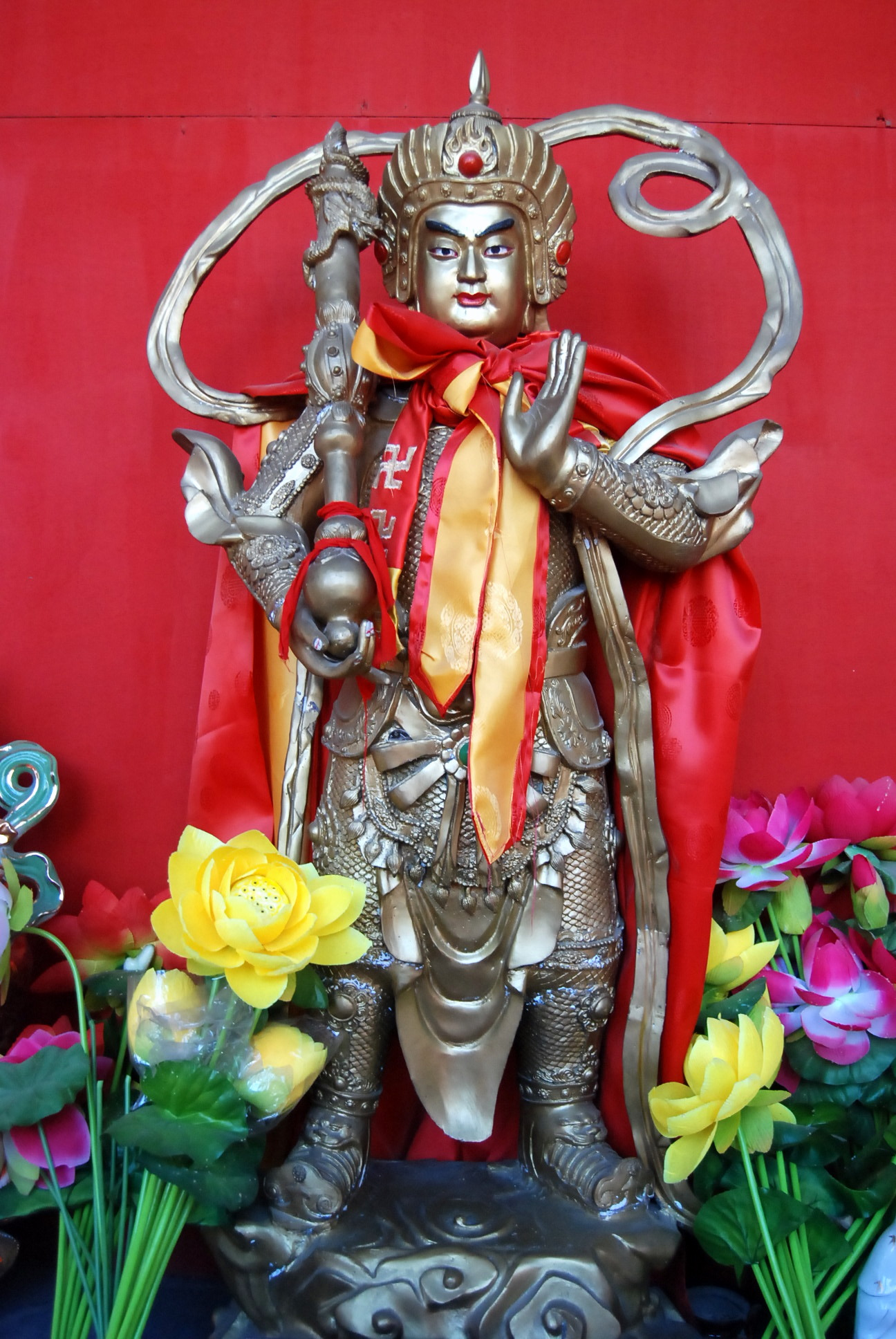
Statue of Weituo at Miaoying Temple in Beijing, China.

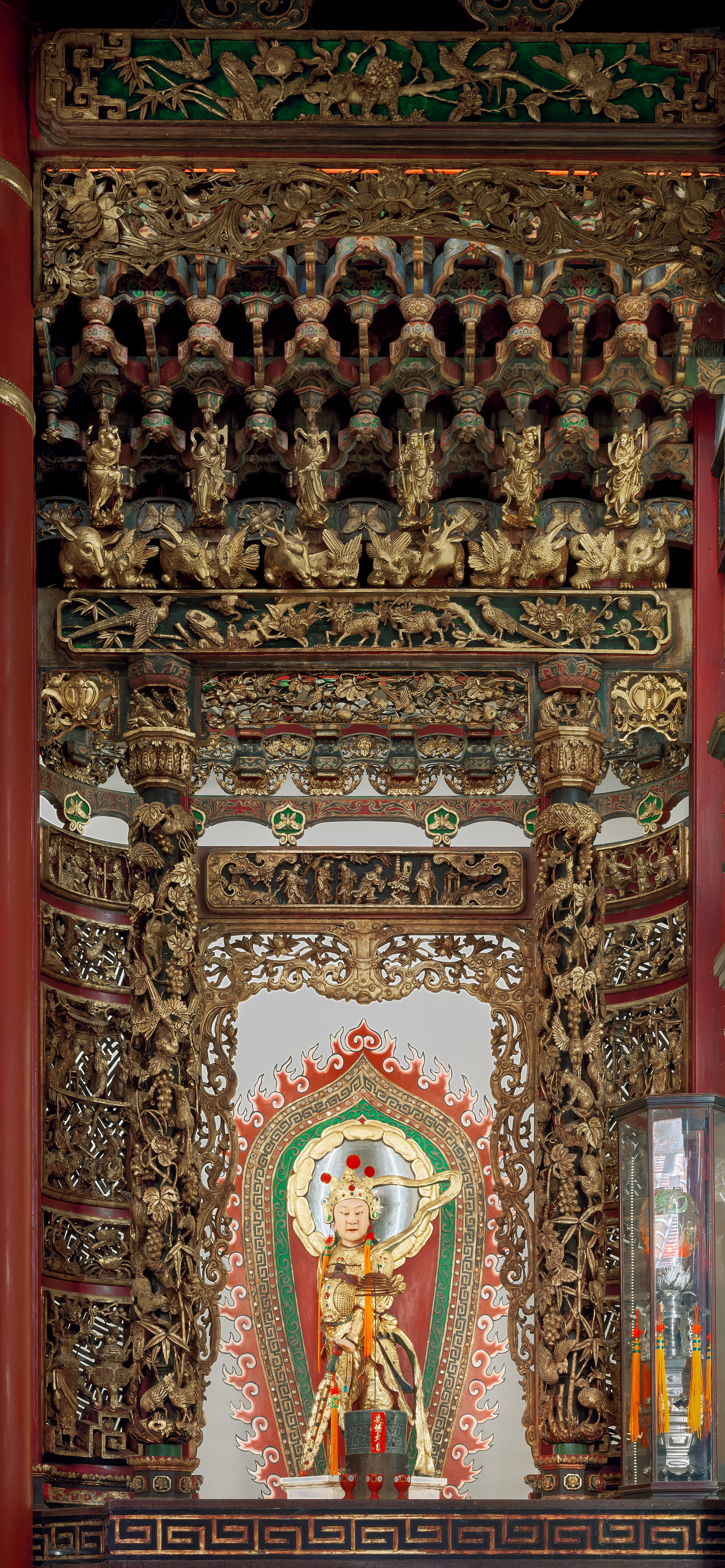
Statue of Weituo at Kaohsiung Daitian Temple, Taiwan.

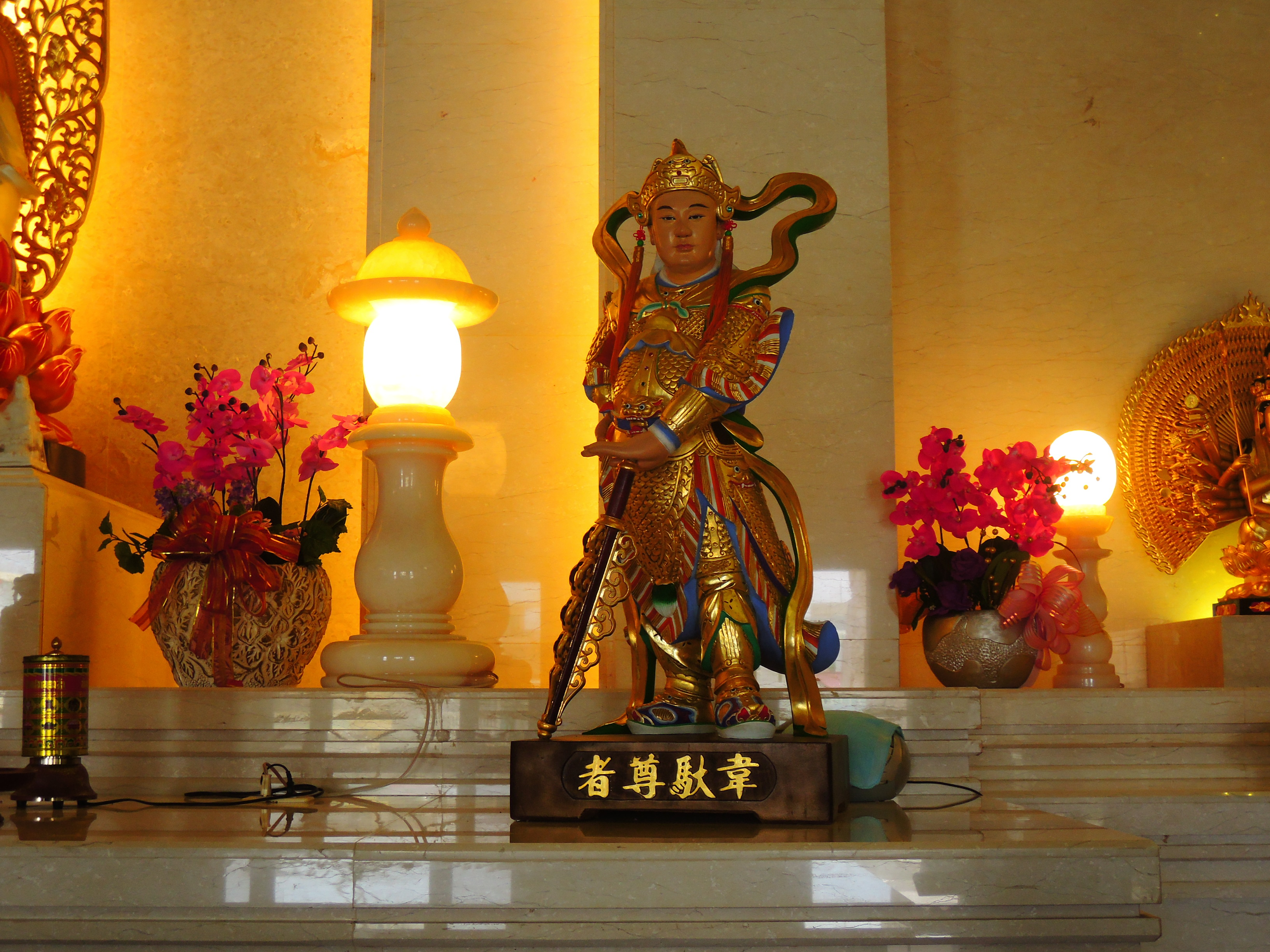
Statue of Weituo at Dachi Xinlin Temple in Penghu, Taiwan.

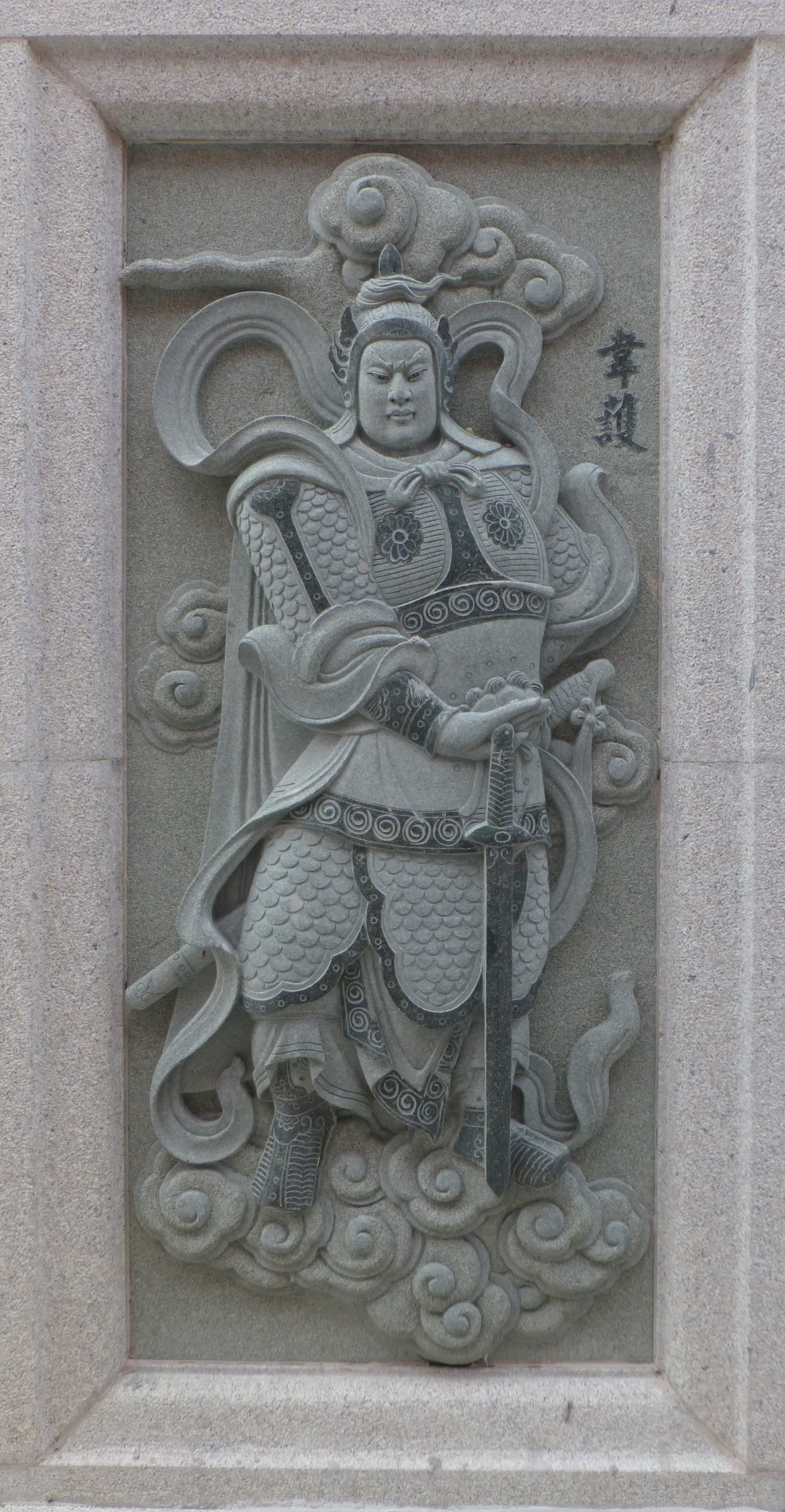
Statue of Weituo at Ping Sien Si Temple in Pasir Panjang, Perak, Malaysia.

== See also ==
- Dharmapala
- Kataragama deviyo, the Sri Lankan Buddhist representation of Skanda
- Kartikeya, the Hindu origin of Skanda
- Śakra (Buddhism)
- Tara (Buddhism)
