= Kampnagel =

Theatre in Hamburg, Germany

Coordinates: 53°34′59″N 10°01′15″E

Kampnagel logo

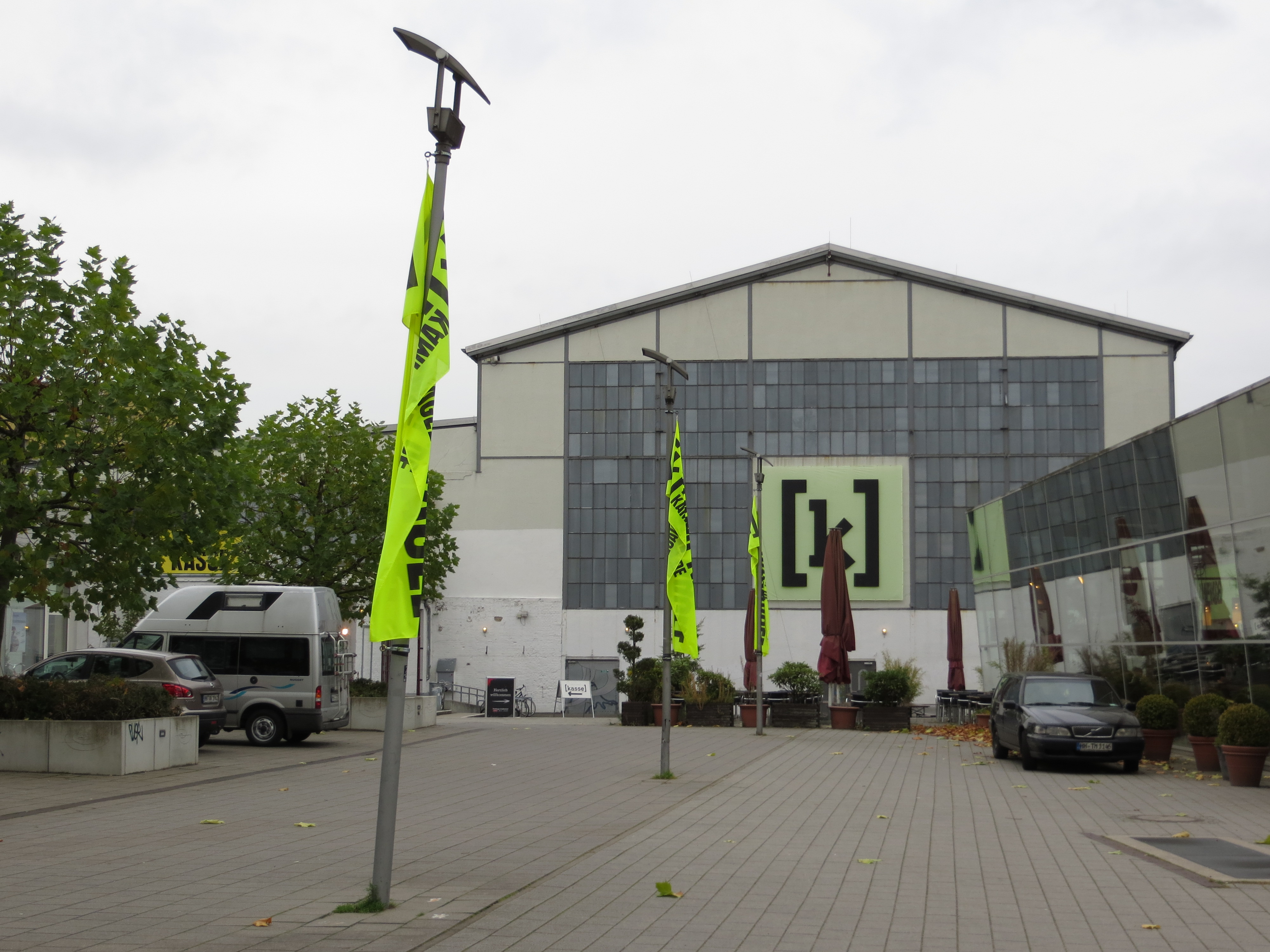
The big hall, Theatre entrance

Kampnagel is a theatre in Hamburg, Germany. It is Germany's biggest independent production venue for the performing arts. It is based on the premises of a former mechanical engineering factory in Winterhude, founded in 1865.

== History ==
Since 1982 Kampnagel has been hosting and producing cultural activities, theatre and dance performances and concerts. The site also hosts a number of festivals such as the "Internationales Sommerfestival" (International Summer Festival).

In 2022, Federal Commissioner for Culture and the Media Claudia Roth and Hamburg's State Minister for Cultural Affairs Carsten Brosda announced that Jean-Philippe Vassal and Anne Lacaton of Paris-based architectural firm Lacaton & Vassal would be awarded the contract for the renovation and expansion of Kampnagel.
