= Erich Schelling =

German architect and Nazi (1904–1986)

Erich Schelling (11 September 1904 Wiesloch – 14 November 1986 Karlsruhe) was a German architect.

He was born in Wiesloch near Heidelberg and studied at the State Technical College (later the Fachhochschule) in Karlsruhe from 1924 to 1928 and the Technical University (today the Karlsruhe Institute of Technology), until May 1933.

In 1933 and 1934, Schelling joined several Nazi organizations, notably the Sturmabteilung (SA) paramilitary organization and the Reich Chamber of Culture (in its Reich Chamber of Fine Arts subdivision), which had just been founded to repress all art that did not support Nazi ideals. He remained active in all of these organizations until the Nazi state fell in 1945, and was promoted in the SA three times.

He was made head of the architectural office at Hermann Alker before leaving to set up his own office in Karlsruhe in 1937. Later that year he was appointed Professor of Architecture at the State Technical College. His first major commission was the conversion of a Karlsruhe building slated to be a Nazi publishing house in 1939. In 1942 he opened a second office in Strasbourg, where he was commissioned to construct a new administrative building and to redesign the Senate Council Chamber for the University of Strasbourg.

After the war he worked on the reconstruction of industry, particularly on the FAG Kugelfischer factories in Schweinfurt.

His major achievement, in collaboration with the engineer Ulrich Finsterwalder, was the design and construction in 1953 of the Schwarzwaldhalle in Karlsruhe, which has the first hanging paraboloid roof in reinforced concrete to be constructed in Europe.

From 1955 to his death, he supervised the development of Karlsruhe's nuclear research centre, including the research reactor, the central administrative building, the college of nuclear technology, the information centre, the security headquarter and a variety of workshops and laboratories.

Schelling's buildings help define the image of Karlsruhe. Some of them, such as the Schwarzwaldhalle, the Nancyhalle, the Chamber of Crafts and Trades and the State Insurance Institute, are listed as cultural monuments.

He married interior designer Trude Schelling-Karrer, who collaborated with him in his work. In 1992, after Schelling's death, she founded the Schelling Architecture Foundation, which she ran until her own death in 2009. The Foundation awards the Schelling Architecture Award and the Schelling Architecture Theory Award every two years in his honour.

== Work ==
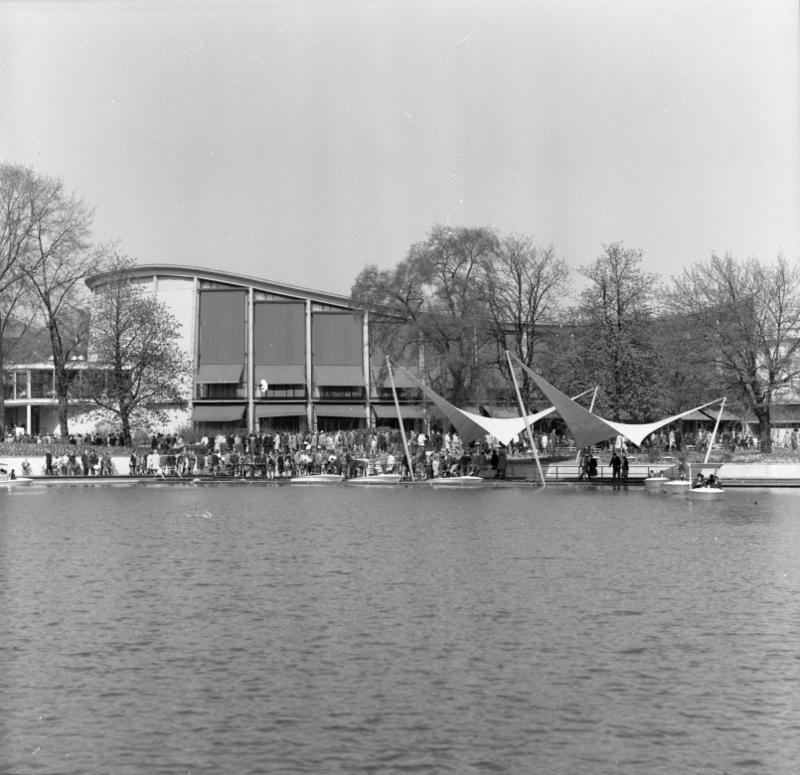
The Schwarzwaldhalle in Karlsruhe during the Bundesgartenschau 1967

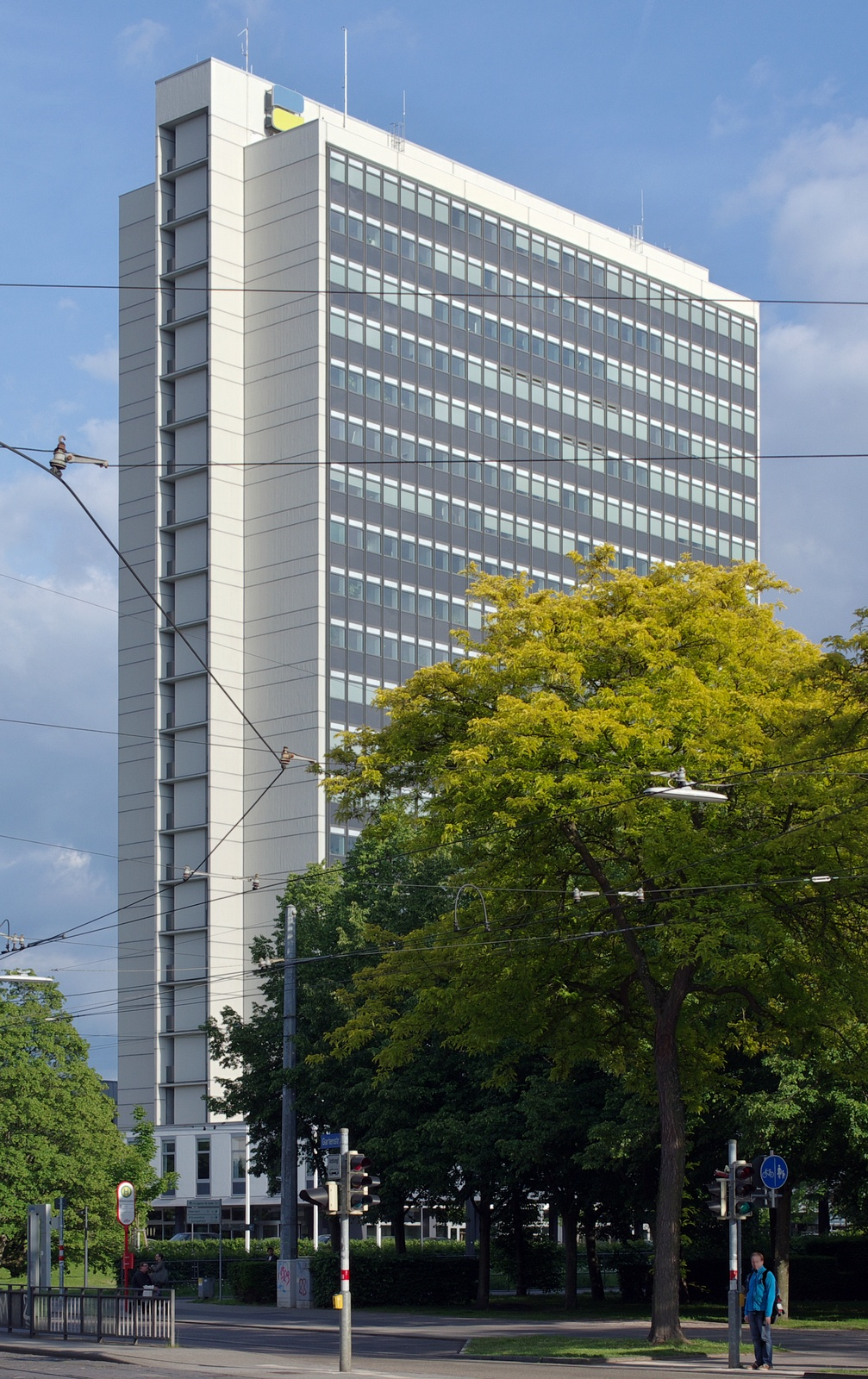
High rise Insurance Company building by Schelling, 1963

- 1939 Publishing House for the Nazi propaganda newspaper Der Führer (today the Badische Neueste Nachrichten) in the Lammstrasse, Karlsruhe
- 1949–60: Factories for FAG Kugelfischer, Schweinfurt
- 1952: Reconstruction of the administrative building for the Dresdner Bank in Marktplatz, Karlsruhe
- 1953: Administration building for the Badenia Building Society, Karlsruhe
- 1953: Schwarzwaldhalle, Karlsruhe
- 1954/55: Gartenhalle, Karlsruhe
- 1954/55: Wildparkstadion, Karlsruhe
- 1954/55: Administration building for the Volksbank in Marktplatz, Karlsruhe
- 1954: Extension of the Town Hall, Schweinfurt
- 1955–86: Development of the Karlsruhe Institute of Technology
- 1957/58: Chamber of Crafts and Trades, Karlsruhe
- 1958–63: High-rise building for the State Insurance Institute, Baden, Karlsruhe
- 1958–60: Extension of the Federal Law Courts, Karlsruhe
- 1961–66: City Theatre, Schweinfurt
- 1964–66: Nancyhalle, Karlsruhe
- 1968–70: Institut Max von Laue-Paul Langevin, Grenoble
- 1969–71: Condominium in Karlsruhe-Oberreut
- 1974–77: Extension of the State Insurance Institute, Baden, Karlsruhe

== Other work ==
- 1940–42: Design for "New Strasbourg”
- 1952: Design for the Tullabad, Karlsruhe
- 1959: Museum Georg Schäfer, Schweinfurt
- 1960: First competition for the Badische Staatstheater Karlsruhe
- 1963: Second competition for the Badische Staatstheater, Karlsruhe

== Bibliography ==
- Erich Schelling – Architekt 1904–1986. With a foreword by Heinrich Klotz. Aries, München 1994, ISBN 3-920041-42-9

== Schelling Architecture Award ==
- 1992: Helmut Swiczinsky and Wolf D. Prix of Coop Himmelb(l)au
- 1994: Zaha Hadid
- 1996: Peter Zumthor
- 1998: Sauerbruch Hutton, Busse & Geitner
- 2000: Kazuyo Sejima
- 2004: Benjamin Foerster-Baldenius, raumlabor
- 2006: Anne Lacaton & Jean-Philippe Vassal
- 2008: Jan Olav Jensen & Børre Skodvin, Jensen & Skodvin Architects
- 2010: Wang Shu & Lu Wenyu of Amateur Architecture Studio
- 2012: Al Borde Arquitectos
- 2014: Diébédo Francis Kéré
- 2016: Architecten de Vylder Vinck Taillieu
- 2018: Rotor Architects
- 2020: Lina Ghotmeh
- 2022: Sophie Delhay
- 2024: LOLA Landscape Architects, Rotterdam. Publikumspreis an Bas Smets, Brüssel

== Schelling Architecture Theory Prize ==
- 1992: Werner Durth
- 1994: Wolfgang Pehnt
- 1996: Nikolaus Kuhnert
- 1998: Stanislaus von Moos
- 2000: Martin Steinmann
- 2004: Manuel Castells
- 2006: Werner Sewing
- 2008: Friedrich Achleitner
- 2010: Jean-Louis Cohen
- 2012: Kenneth Frampton
- 2014: Juhani Pallasmaa
- 2016: Doug Saunders
- 2018: Keller Easterling
- 2020: Itohan Osayimwese
- 2022: Paola Viganò
- 2024: James Bridle, announced and rescinded due to the artist's commitment to the Palestinian Campaign for the Academic and Cultural Boycott of Israel.
