= Lu Wenyu =

Chinese architect

- 陆文宇
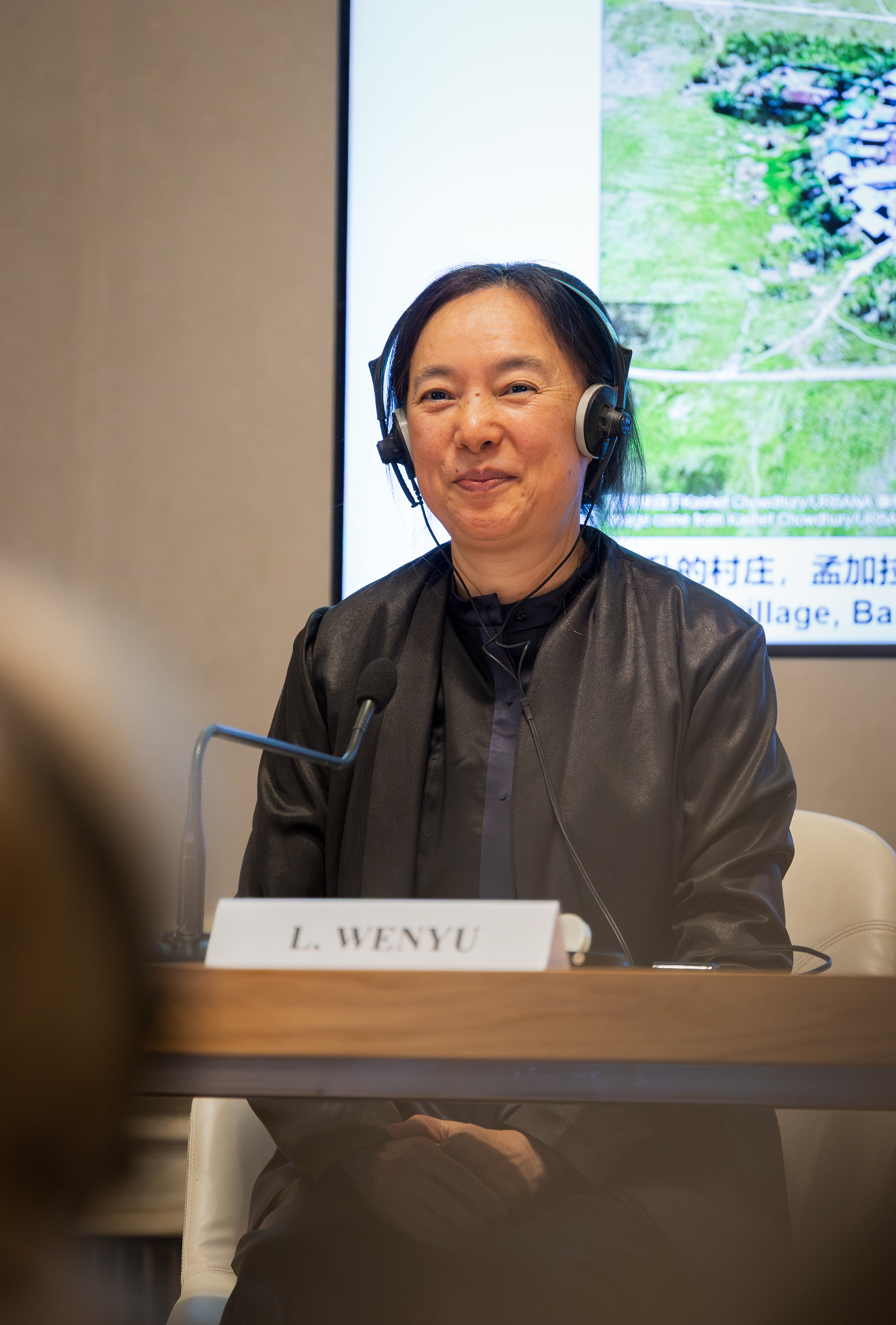
- Lu Wenyu Curator at Venice Biennale
- Born: 1967 (age 58–59)
- Occupation: Architect
- Organization: Amateur Architecture Studio
- Awards: Schelling Architecture Prize

Lu Wenyu (Chinese: 陆文宇; born 1967) is a Chinese architect. She co-founded the firm Amateur Architecture Studio in Hangzhou, China, which became known for its use of natural materials and traditional techniques. In 2010, Lu Wenyu and her partner Wang Shu won the German Schelling Architecture Prize for their work with Amateur Architecture.

== Early life and education ==
Lu Wenyu grew up in Urumqi, a city in Xinjiang in the remote western province of China. Her school teacher who had been an architect taught her how to draw and encouraged her to apply to Nanjing's Southeast University to study architecture. Lu Wenyu studied architecture at Nanjing Institute of Technology.

== Career ==
=== 1997–2002 ===
She co-founded Amateur Architecture Studio in 1997, alongside business partner Wang Shu, in Hangzhou, China. They chose the name as a rebuke of the "professional, soulless architecture" practiced in China, which they believe has contributed to the large-scale demolition of many old urban neighborhoods. The practice became known for its use of natural materials such as wood, stones, and mud, bringing in aspects of the greater landscape. In 2013 Lu Wenyu was quoted stating that "[At Amateur Architecture Studio] we spend an enormous amount of time experimenting, trying to resurrect the craftsmanship that is almost lost. We use a method that is passed on, hand-to-hand, to re-establish tradition instead of talking about abstract but empty concepts."

=== 2003–present ===
She worked on the Ningbo History Museum from 2003 until 2008. In 2006, she worked on the Tiled Garden installation at the 2006 Venice Biennale, where "a sea of tens of thousands of recycled tiles from the local area were carefully laid in rows and accessed by pedestrian bamboo bridges."

Around 2012, she had taught a course for several years at Harvard’s Graduate School of Design. In 2012, she and Wang began working on a transformation of the village Wencun, with about 400 residents, and by 2016, 14 new houses had been built. The development was intended to serve as a prototype for salvaging other villages. They later showcased materials used in the rebuild at the 2016 Venice architecture biennale.

In July 2016, she and Shu gave the annual architecture lecture at The Royal Academy. In 2017, some work by Lu Wenyu was exhibited in Louisiana, including photographs, models and material samples in three galleries. The first included a model of Xiangshan Campus, the third included features from the Ningbo History Museum. She and Wang also designed Huang Gonwang Museum, located in Fuyang.

== Awards ==
In 2010, Lu Wenyu and Wang Shu together won the German Schelling Architecture Prize.

In 2012, Wang Shu was awarded the Pritzker Prize for the work the duo completed together in their firm, Amateur Architecture Studio. In an interview with the Los Angeles Times, Wang Shu expressed his sentiment that Lu Wenyu deserved to share the Pritzker Prize with him.

In 2019, Lu received the 2019 Gold Medal of Tau Sigma Delta.

Lu is a Juror of the UNESCO Asia-Pacific Awards for Cultural Heritage Conservation.

== Personal life ==
She met her husband, architect Wang Shu, when both were students of architecture at Nanjing Institute of Technology. They have a son together.

Lu Wenyu does not like to speak in public. She spoke in an interview stating "I don't want the public to know much about me".

== Works ==
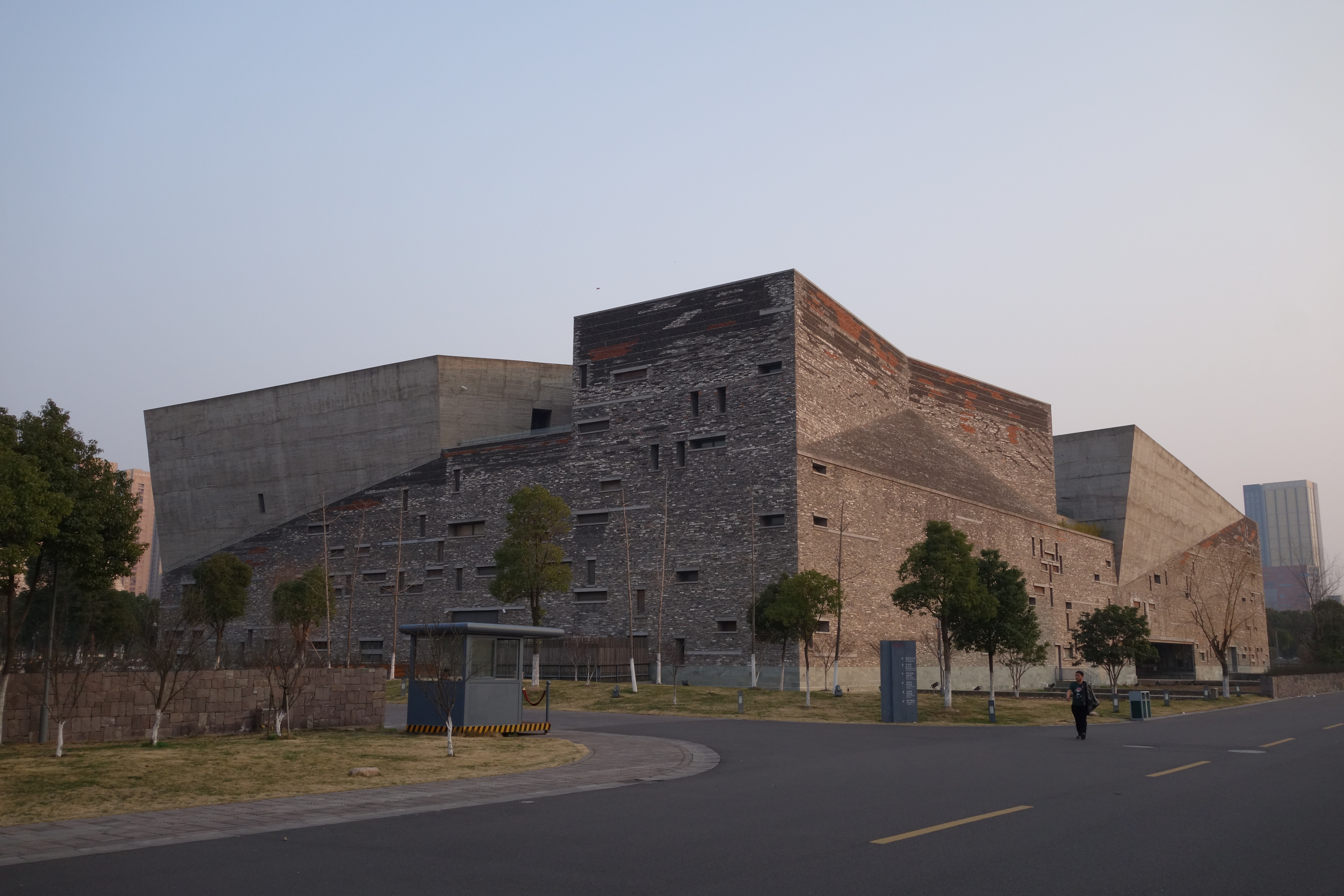
Ningbo Museum (2008)

- Library of Wenzheng College, Soochow University, China (2000)
- Ningbo Contemporary Art Museum, Ningbo, China (2005)
- Five Scattered Houses, Ningbo, China (2005)
- Xiangshan Campus, China Academy of Art (Phase I) Hangzhou, China (2004)
- Xiangshan Campus, China Academy of Art (Phase II) Hangzhou, China (2007)
- Ceramic House, Jinhua, China (2006)
- Vertical Courtyard Apartments, Hangzhou, China (2007)
- Ningbo History Museum, Ningbo, China (2008)
- Exhibition Hall of the Imperial Street of Southern Song Dynasty, Hangzhou, China (2009)
