= Nancyhalle =

Former German event hall

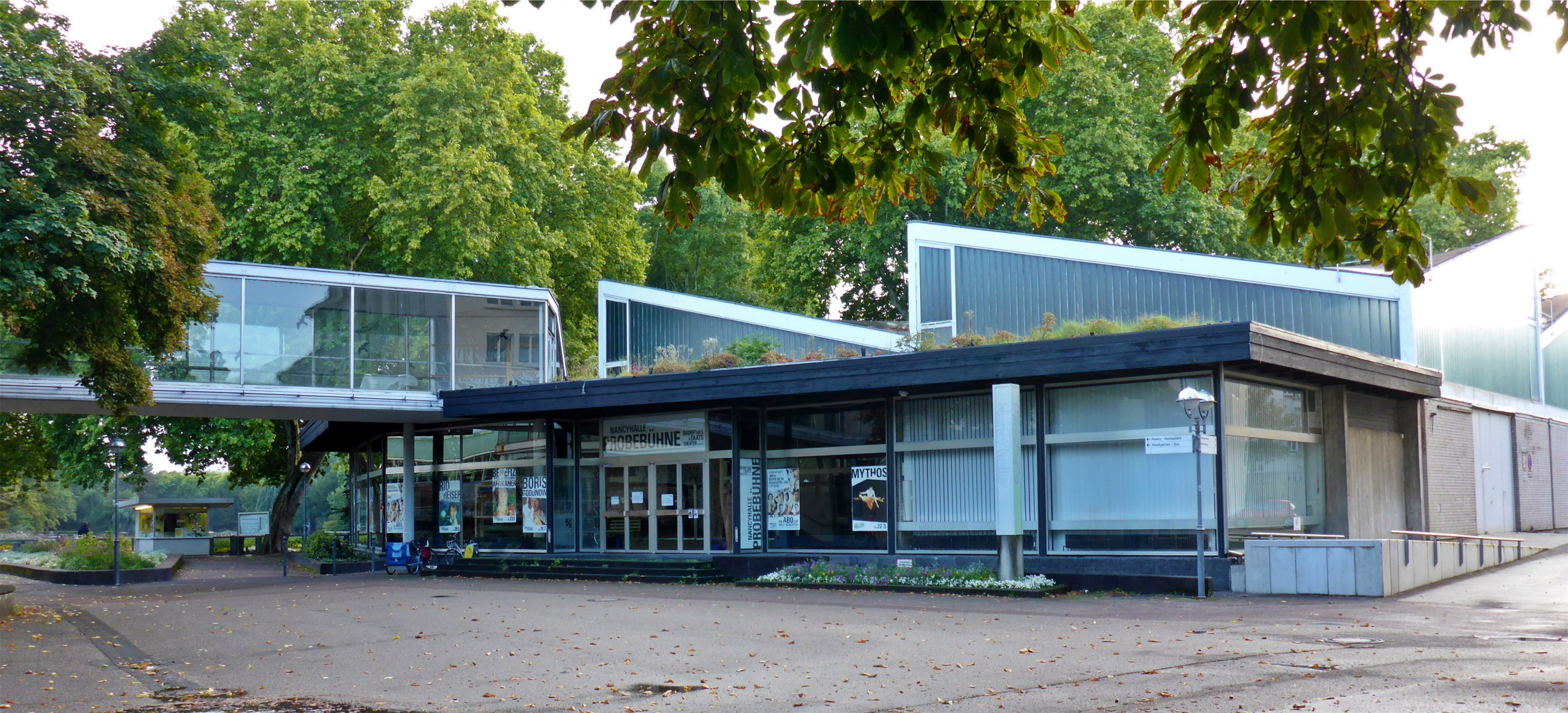
Nancyhalle, view from the Festplatz

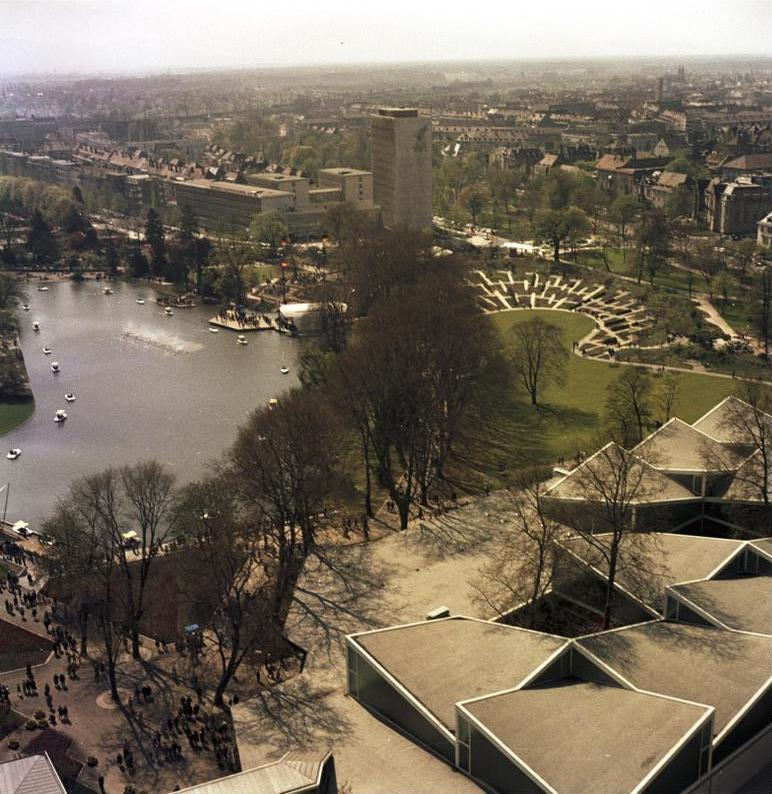
The roofscape of the Nancyhalle (front right). Photo taken during the Federal Garden Show 1967

The Nancyhalle (also Nancy-Halle) is a listed former event hall in the centre of the Festplatz in Karlsruhe. Until 2013, the Nancyhalle was part of the Kongresszentrum Karlsruhe. Named after Karlsruhe's twin city Nancy, the building is located on the southwest corner of the Festplatz between Schwarzwaldhalle, the concert hall and Stadtgarten. It was planned by Erich Schelling for a limited lifetime as an additional exhibition space on the occasion of the Bundesgartenschau in 1967 and opened in 1966. It is now in great need of renovation. The Nancyhalle is a listed structure together with the Schwarzwaldhalle. The glazed framing is built around two open courtyards containing old trees. From 2004 to 2007, Luigi Colani presented an exhibition of his life's work in the Nancyhalle. Today, the Nancyhalle is no longer used by the Congress and Exhibition GmbH. At the end of 2011, the municipal council approved the use of the hall as a rehearsal stage centre for the Badisches Staatstheater Karlsruhe for a transitional period of about seven to ten years.
