= DZI =

Dzi or DZI may refer to:

- Dzi bead
- DZI, a Bulgarian insurance company
- Deep Zoom Image, computer image file format
