= Wang Shu =

Chinese architect

- 王澍
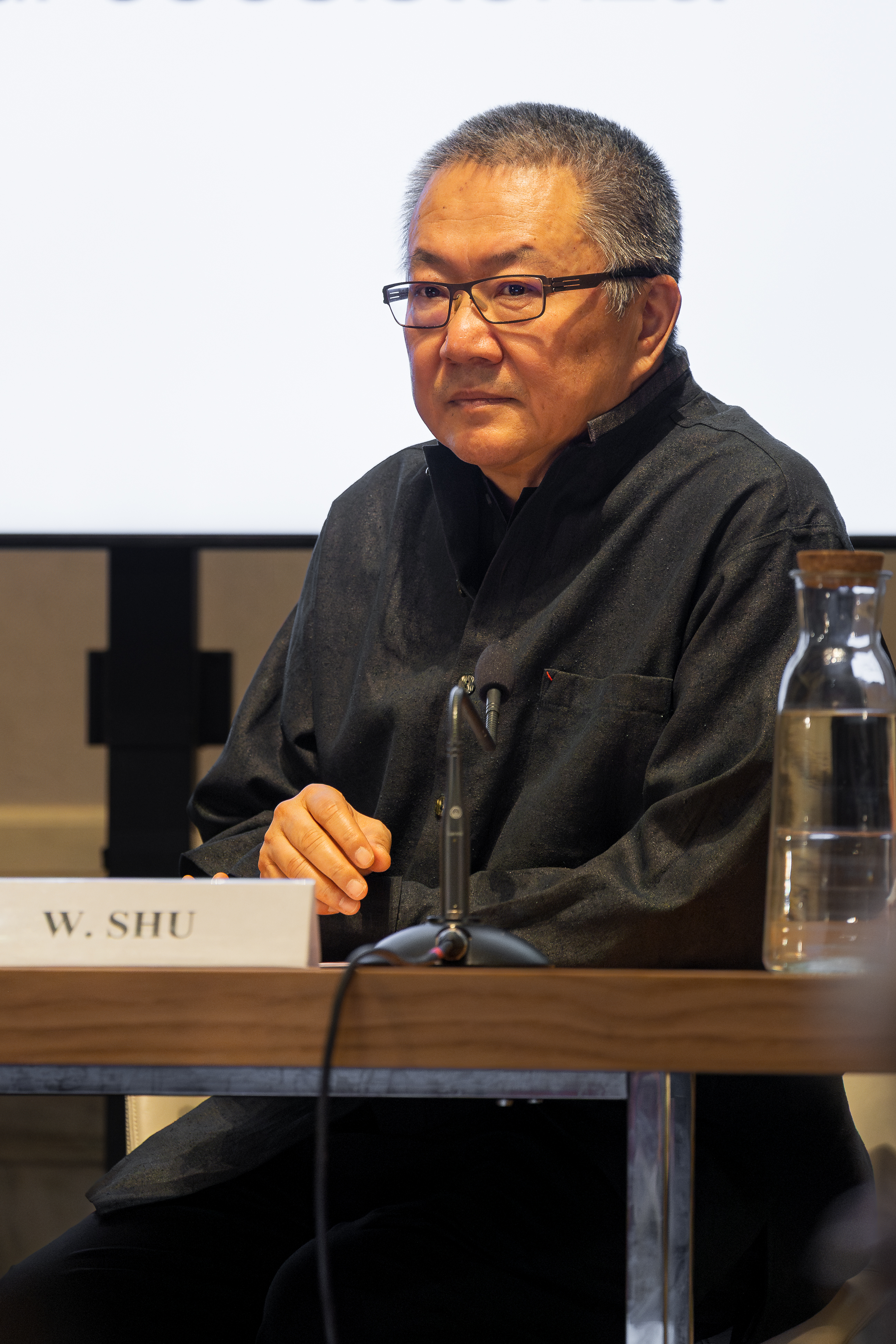
- Born: 4 November 1963 (age 62); Ürümqi, Xinjiang, China
- Education: Nanjing Institute of Technology, now known as Southeast University, and Tongji University
- Occupation: Architect
- Awards: Pritzker Prize
- Buildings: Ningbo Museum

Wang Shu (Chinese: 王澍, born 4 November 1963) is a Chinese architect based in Hangzhou, Zhejiang Province. He is the dean of the School of Architecture of the China Academy of Art. With his practice partner and wife Lu Wenyu, he founded the firm Amateur Architecture Studio. In 2012, Wang became the first Chinese citizen to win the Pritzker Prize, the world's top prize in architecture. The award was the subject of some controversy since the Pritzker committee did not also award Lu Wenyu, his wife and architectural partner, despite their years of collaboration.

== Early life and education ==
Wang Shu was born on 4 November 1963 in Ürümqi, the capital of the Xinjiang Uyghur Autonomous Region in China's far west. He began to draw and paint as a child, without any formal training in art. Despite the anti-intellectual fervor of the "cultural revolution" (1966–76), his mother gave him access to the library and he read widely, from "Pushkin to Lu Xun." As a compromise between his passion of art and engineering, his parents' recommendation, Wang chose to study architecture at the School of Architecture of Southeast University in Nanjing, Jiangsu Province (previously named Nanjing Institute of Technology) and received a bachelor's degree in 1985 and a master's degree in 1988.

Although Wang lived in Ürümqi and Beijing in his early life, after college he moved to Hangzhou for the city's natural landscapes and ancient tradition of art. He worked for the Zhejiang Academy of Fine Arts (now China Academy of Art) and in 1990 completed his first architectural project, a youth centre in the city of Haining near Hangzhou.

Wang did not have any commissions between 1990 and 1998. During that time his wife Lu Wenyu supported the family. Instead, he chose to further his studies at the School of Architecture of Tongji University in Shanghai, earning a PhD in 2000.

== Career ==
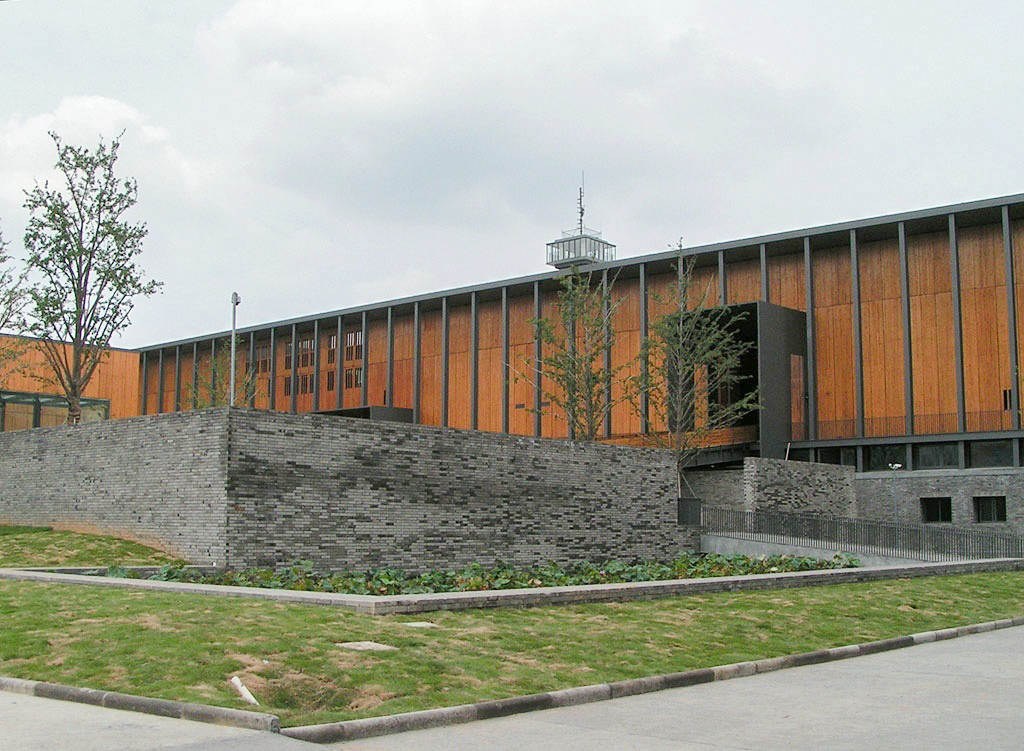
Ningbo Museum of Art (2005)

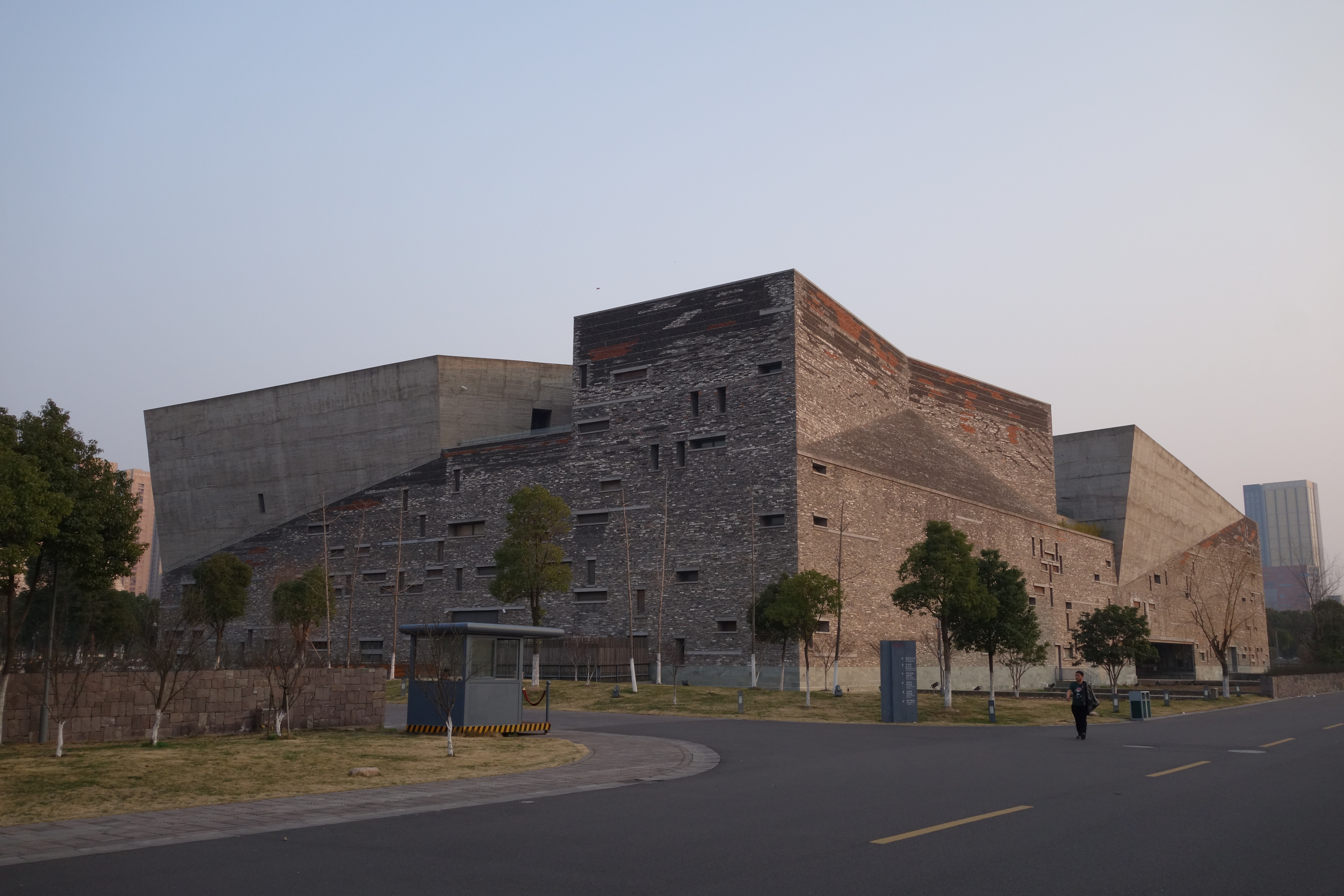
Ningbo Museum (2008)

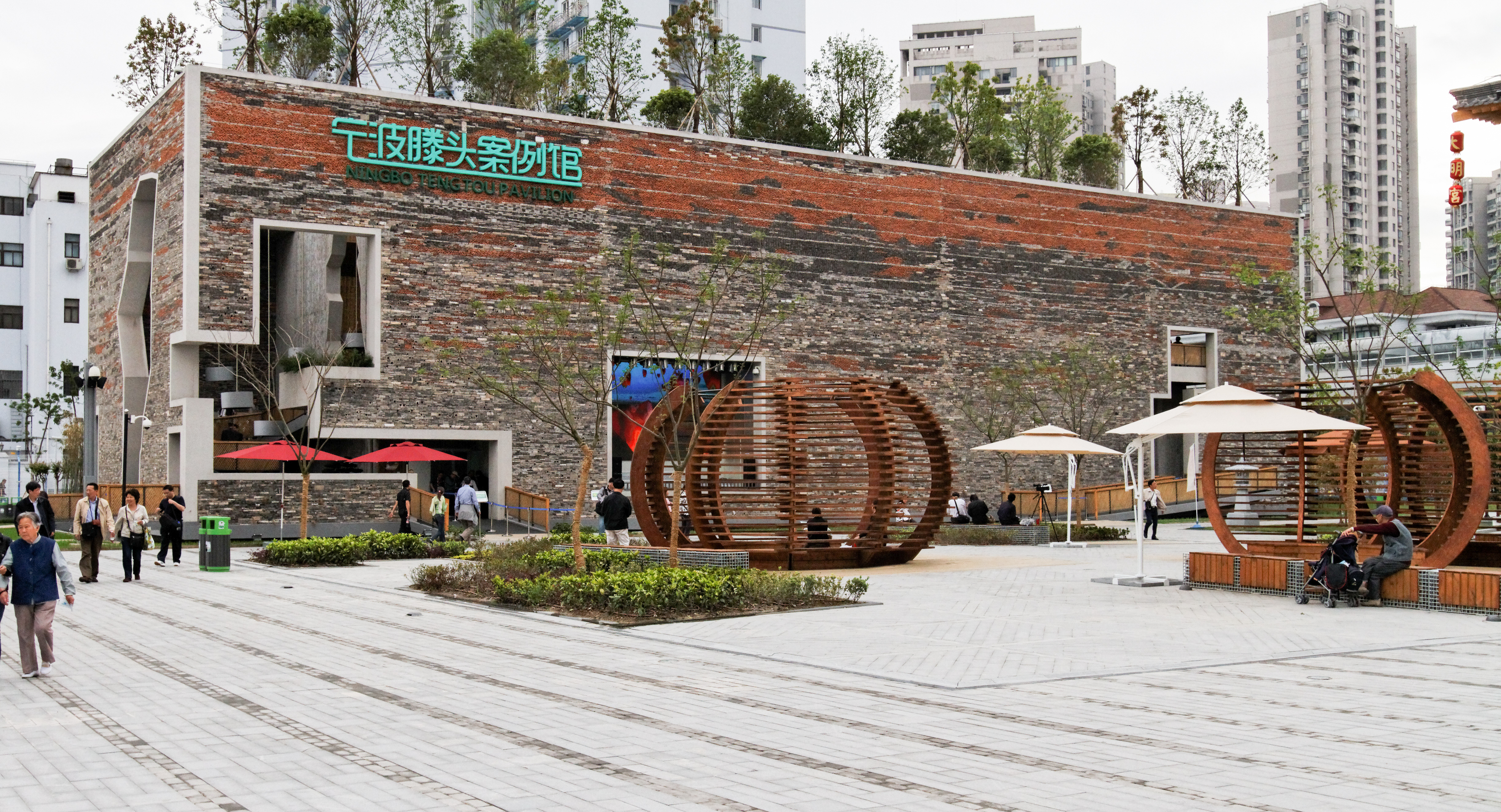
Ningbo Tengtou Pavilion, Shanghai Expo (2010)

In 1997, Wang and his wife Lu Wenyu, also an architect, founded the firm Amateur Architecture Studio. They chose the name as a rebuke of the "professional, soulless architecture" practiced in China, which they believe has contributed to the large-scale demolition of many old urban neighborhoods.

Wang joined the faculty of the China Academy of Art in 2000 as a professor, became the Head of the Architecture Department in 2003, and was named Dean of the School of Architecture in 2007.

In 2000, Wang designed the Library of Wenzheng College at Soochow University, which won the inaugural Architecture Art Award of China in 2004. His Five Scattered Houses in Ningbo won the Holcim Award for Sustainable Construction in the Asia Pacific in 2005. In 2008 his Vertical Courtyard Apartments in Hangzhou was nominated for the International Highrise Award.

In 2008 he completed the Ningbo Museum, a project he won in 2004 after an international competition. The building's facade is constructed entirely of recycled bricks, and its shape - resembling nearby mountains - reflects its natural setting. The museum won the 2009 Lu Ban Prize, the top architecture prize in China.

Wang's other major projects include the Ningbo Museum of Art (2005), the Xiangshan campus of the China Academy of Art (2007) and the Old Town Conservation of Zhongshan Street, Hangzhou (2009).

His architecture has been described as "opening new horizons while at the same time resonates with place and memory", experimental, and as a rare example of critical regionalism in China.

== Design approach ==
Wang creates modern buildings making use of traditional materials and applying older techniques. The Ningbo Museum is constructed of bricks salvaged from buildings which had been demolished to facilitate new developments. Wang is a keen supporter of architectural heritage where globalisation has stripped cities of their special attributes.

"In an age where the goal is to offer a distinct, individualized style, Shu has shied away from such a prerogative. Ironically, with his manner of seamlessly meshing the contemporary with the cultural, innovation with tradition, Shu’s work has come to define itself. The work is infused with fresh material juxtapositions and an expressive quality grounded in traditional formal proportions and scale."

He requires his freshman architecture students to spend a year working with their hands, learning basic carpentry and bricklaying, and Wang also requires other teachers in the department learn basic building skills, because he believes "Only people who understand the nature of materials can make art using the materials."

== Awards ==
In 2007, Wang Shu and Lu Wenyu were awarded the first Global Award for Sustainable Architecture, alongside the future Pritker Prize Balkrishna Doshi, Françoise-Hélène Jourda, Stefan Behnisch and Hermann Kaufmann.

In 2010, Wang and his wife Lu Wenyu together won the German Schelling Architecture Prize, and in 2011 he received the Gold Medal from the French Academy of Architecture.

In 2012, Wang won the Pritzker Architecture Prize. In so doing, he became the first Chinese citizen (second winner of Chinese descent after I. M. Pei) to win this prize, and the fourth youngest person to win. The jury, which included Pritzker laureate Zaha Hadid and the US Supreme Court justice Stephen Breyer, highlighted Wang's "unique ability to evoke the past, without making direct references to history" and called his work "timeless, deeply rooted in its context and yet universal." The chairman of the Hyatt Foundation said Wang's win represented "a significant step in acknowledging the role that China will play in the development of architectural ideals" going forward. Zhu Tao, a Chinese architectural critic and historian, speculated that the win could signify a turning point in Chinese architectural history saying the prize "sends a message that architecture is a cultural enterprise ... that architects are creators of culture."

Alejandro Aravena, a member of the Pritzker Prize jury, stated "Wang Shu’s outstanding architecture may be the consequence of being able to combine talent and intelligence. This combination allows him to produce masterpieces when a monument is needed, but also very careful and contained architecture when a monument is not the case. The intensity of his work may be a consequence of his relative youth, but the precision and appropriateness of his operations talk of great maturity."

== Personal life ==
Wang Shu's father is a musician and an amateur carpenter. His mother is a teacher and school librarian in Beijing. His sister is also a teacher.

Wang is married to Lu Wenyu, who is also his business partner and fellow professor of architecture at the China Academy of Art. In an interview with the Los Angeles Times, Wang expressed his sentiment that his wife deserved to share the Pritzker Prize with him.

== Major works ==
Major works by Wang include:

Completed

- Youth Center (1990), Haining
- Library of Wenzheng College at Soochow University (1999–2000), Suzhou
- Ningbo Museum of Art (2001–05)
- Xiangshan Campus, China Academy of Art, Phases I & II (2002–07), Hangzhou
- Vertical Courtyard Apartments (2002–07), Hangzhou
- Sanhe House (2003), Nanjing
- Teaching Building of the Music and Dance Department (2003–05), Dongguan
- Ceramic House (2003–06), Jinhua
- Five Scattered Houses (2003–06), Ningbo
- Ningbo Museum (2003–08)
- Tiled garden, Venice Biennale of Architecture (2006), Italy
- Old Town Conservation of Zhongshan Street (2007–09), Hangzhou
- Exhibition Hall of the Imperial Street of Southern Song Dynasty (2009), Hangzhou
- Ningbo Tengtou Pavilion, Shanghai Expo (2010)
- Bus Stop in Krumbach, Austria (2014)
- Weilaizhitong Science Park (未来之瞳科学公园), Chang'an District, Xi'an (2024)

Under construction or in design phase

- Heyun Culture and Leisure Centers (2009), Kunming
- City Cultural Center (2010), Jinhua
- Shi Li Hong Zhuang Traditional Dowry Museum (2010), Ninghai
- Contemporary Art Museum on the Dock (2010), Zhoushan
- Buddhist Institute Library (2011), Hangzhou
