= Konzerthaus =

Konzerthaus is German for concert hall. It may refer to:

- Konzerthaus Berlin
- Konzerthaus Freiburg
- Konzerthaus, Vienna
- Kongresszentrum Karlsruhe § Konzerthaus
