= Großer BDA Preis =

German architecture award

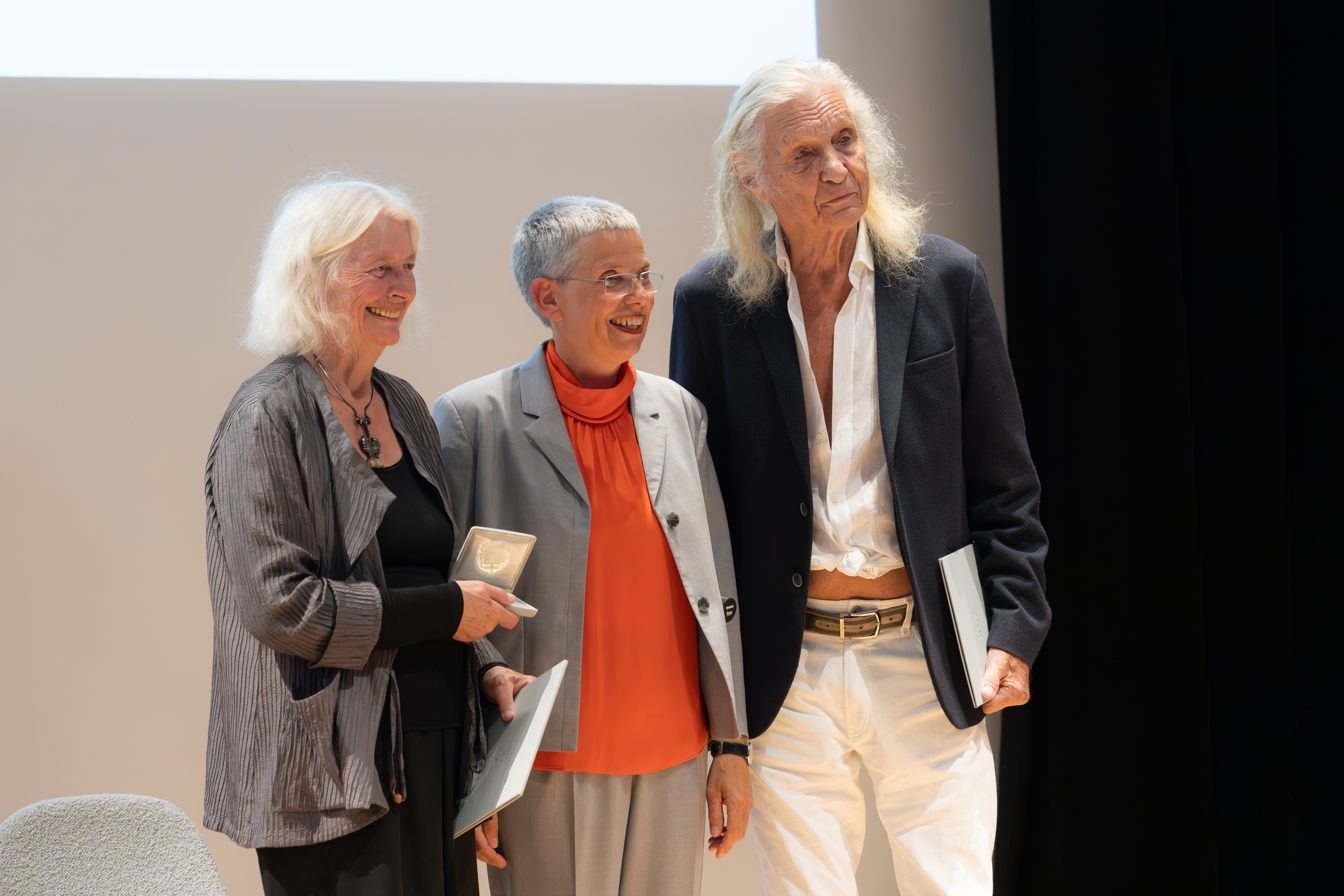
Award ceremony for the BDA Grand Award 2023: Inken Baller, Hinrich Baller and Susanne Wartzek, President of BDA (middle)

The Großer BDA Preis (BDA Grand Award) is an architecture prize founded in Berlin in 1963. The Association of German Architects (BDA) honors architects, urban planners at home and abroad every three years for their outstanding achievements in architecture or urban development. The award is endowed with a certificate, a cash prize of €5,000 and a gold medal. The gold medal shows Daedalus and a maze based on the labyrinth of Knossos.

== Recipients ==
- 1964: Hans Scharoun, Berlin
- 1966: Ludwig Mies van der Rohe, Chicago
- 1968: Egon Eiermann, Karlsruhe
- 1972: Günter Behnisch & Partner, Stuttgart
- 1973: Michael Eberl & Partner, Munich
- 1975: Arbeitsausschuss des Evangelischen Kirchenbautages and Gottfried Böhm, Cologne
- 1978: Carlfried Mutschler & Partner, Mannheim
- 1982: Frei Otto, Warmbronn
- 1987: Oswald Mathias Ungers, Cologne
- 1990: Karljosef Schattner, Eichstätt
- 1993: Thomas Herzog, Munich
- 1996: Heinz Bienefeld, Swisttal (postum)
- 1999: Hanns Adrian, Hanover
- 2005: Meinhard von Gerkan and Volkwin Marg, Hamburg
- 2008: Joachim Schürmann and Margot Schürmann, Cologne (postum)
- 2011: Volker Staab, Berlin
- 2014: Axel Schultes, Berlin
- 2017: Peter Zumthor, Haldenstein
- 2020: Anne Lacaton and Jean-Philippe Vassal, Paris
- 2023: Inken Baller and Hinrich Baller
