= Lacaton & Vassal =

French architecture firm

Lacaton & Vassal is an architecture agency founded by Anne Lacaton and Jean-Philippe Vassal in 1987. Their projects include private and social housing, cultural and academic institutions and public spaces. They are particularly well known for their transformations of existing social housing structures and for their economical use of materials and construction techniques.

The two partners won the Pritzker Prize in 2021.

== Early careers of the partners ==
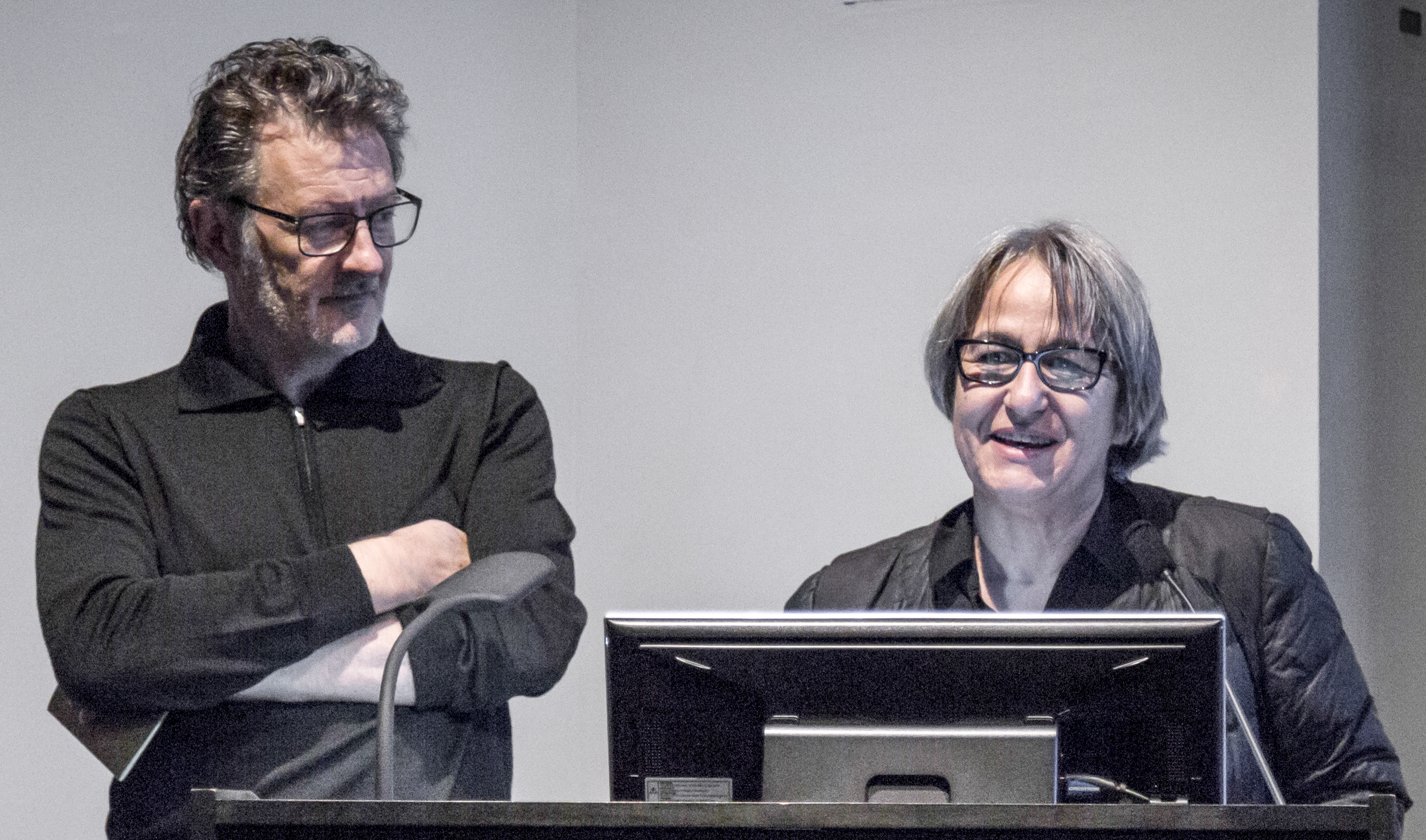
Anne Lacaton and Jean-Philippe Vassal in 2017

Lacaton and Vassal met while they were architecture students. Their first joint project out of architecture school was in Niamey, Niger, where they built a straw hut out of locally sourced bush branches. The building proved to be highly impermanent; it was dismembered by the wind within 2 years of its construction.

More detailed biographies of the two partners follow:

Anne Lacaton was born on 2 August 1955 in Saint-Pardoux-la-Rivière in the Dordogne region of France. She graduated from the École nationale supérieure d'architecture et de paysage de Bordeaux in 1980 and obtained a master's degree in urban planning at the University of Bordeaux III in 1984. From 1982 to 1988, she worked as a researcher and architect for the laboratory and the educational workshop of Arc en rêve center for architecture in Bordeaux.

Jean-Philippe Vassal was born on 22 February 1954 in Casablanca, Morocco. After graduating from the École nationale supérieure d'architecture et de paysage de Bordeaux in 1980, he relocated to Niger, West Africa, where he worked as an architect-urban planner from 1980 to 1985. Recalling his experiences in Niger, Vassal said:

Niger is one of the poorest countries in the world, and the people are so incredible, so generous, doing nearly everything with nothing, finding resources all the time, but with optimism, full of poetry and inventiveness. It was really a second school of architecture.

The two partners founded Lacaton & Vassal in Bordeaux in 1987.

== Approaches to architecture ==
According to the Pritzker prize biography, Lacaton often visited Vassal while he was working in Niger and it was there that they first formulated the philosophy of architecture that was to guide them throughout their careers: "...never demolish what could be redeemed and instead, make sustainable what already exists, thereby extending through addition, respecting the luxury of simplicity and proposing new possibilities." Their aim in prioritising renovation over demolition is to give a "second life" to existing buildings, especially in the area of social housing. Lacaton states: "We never see the existing as a problem. We look with positive eyes because there is an opportunity of doing more with what we already have."

The citation of the Pritzker Prize jury lauds the architects' "restorative architecture" and describes their practice of beginning "every project with a process of discovery which includes intensely observing and finding value in what already exists... There is a humility in the approach that respects the aims of the original designers and the aspirations of the current occupants."

The Pritzker Prize jury also notes that, via their humble approach to the practice of architecture, Lacaton and Vassal have reset the very idea of what it means to be an architect. Their role is not to produce extravagant objects or to make flamboyant architectural statements — rather, the architect observes, improves and serves the needs of individuals and the community in a cost effective and sustainable way.

== Major projects ==
With the Latapie house (1993 in Floirac), Lacaton & Vassal applied greenhouse technologies to create a private winter garden that expanded the living space of a house at relatively low cost. The house is an example of their use of inexpensive building techniques from industry or agriculture. Indeed, greenhouses or winter gardens would become a recurring feature of their projects. Lacaton states: "From very early on, we studied the greenhouses of botanic gardens with their impressive fragile plants, the beautiful light and transparency, and ability to simply transform the outdoor climate. It's an atmosphere and a feeling, and we were interested in bringing that delicacy to architecture."

Lacaton & Vassal has also been successful in both defending and improving the image of social housing with the Cité Manifeste in Mulhouse. The Cité Manifest was an ambitious project involving several well known architectural firms and marking the 150th anniversary of the construction of the Cité Muller, the first workers' housing estate in France. Lacaton & Vassal's objective for this project was to produce quality housing (they delivered 14 low income apartments) which, at equal cost, would be much larger than the apartments typically offered in social housing. An analysis conducted well after the 2005 delivery of the project shows that 10 of the 14 apartments had surface areas that were 50 per cent larger than was typical for low income houses with the same number of rooms. They also provided improved floor plans and amenities (large open-plan volumes, winter gardens, customizable facilities). This project was awarded the national label ‘Remarkable Contemporary Architecture’ in July 2015.

Lacaton & Vassal began design work on the Architecture School of Nantes (L’école nationale supérieure d'architecture de Nantes), a project that was completed in 2009. Here, the areas dedicated to the functions of the school (classrooms, administration, etc.) are juxtaposed with 5,500 square meters of floor space whose functions are not predetermined—they can be redeployed, according to the needs of the moment.

The Bois-le-Prêtre tower, giving directly onto the ring road in northern Paris, is a low income housing development built in the 1960s. Lacaton & Vassal, working with Frédéric Druot, completed renovation of the building in 2010. Without moving the occupants from the building, the architects added space to all the apartments of the complex by grafting on to the structure a series of balconies and winter gardens. In addition to improving luminosity and thermal performance, the surface area of the building went from 8,900 square meters to 12,460 square meters. In November 2011, the project received the most prestigious French architectural award, the Equerre d'argent.

The FRAC Grand Large is a regional museum of contemporary art. Lacaton & Vassal were asked in 2013 to install the museum in a large boathouse in the port of Dunkirk. Their approach to this project was to preserve the original building in its entirety and to build a twin building that houses the museum. The original building is now available to be used either in conjunction with the museum or for other public purposes.

Lacaton & Vassal were project managers for the redevelopment of the art déco-style Palais de Tokyo (a modern art museum in western Paris). In two phases (2003 and 2014), they rehabilitated 14,000 square meters of usable space, essentially by eliminating partitions and false ceilings. The renovation improves the luminosity and the flow through the space, while also revealing the béton brut (unfinished concrete) of the original 1937 construction.

== More recognition ==
Lacaton & Vassal was nominated in 1997 for the 5th prize of the European Union for contemporary architecture Mies-van-der-Rohe in Barcelona.

They received the national grand prize for Young Talent architecture, from the Ministry of Culture, in 1999; almost ten years later, they won the 2008 Grand Prix National de l'Architecture.

In 2018, the Global Award for Sustainable Architecture rewarded their sustainable approach to enhancing buildings and promoting ownership by residents.

In March 2021, Anne Lacaton and Jean-Philippe Vassal were awarded the Pritzker Prize for the entire body of their work.

== Completed projects ==
- Latapie house, Floirac (1993)
- Centre de jour pour post-adolescents, Bègles (1994)
- Archeological Museum, Saintes (1995)
- Place Aucoc, Bordeaux (1996)
- Pierre-Mendès-France University of Grenoble (first stage, 1995 / second stage, 2001) nomination for the Équerre d'argent du Moniteur.
- House in Dordogne (1997)
- House in Lège-Cap-Ferret (1998)
- House in Coutras (2000)
- Contemporary creation exhibit space in the Palais de Tokyo, Paris (2001)
- Café Una de l’Architekturzentrum, Vienna (2001)
- Office building, Nantes (2001)
- Residential building, Floirac (études en cours, 2003)
- Residential building, Cité manifeste à Mulhouse (2005), awarded the label ‘Architecture contemporaine remarquable’ in July 2015
- House, Keremma (2005)
- University building for management studies, Bordeaux (2006)
- Cave Castelmaure, Embres-et-Castelmaure (2007)
- Exhibition hall, Paris Nord Villepinte (2007)
- School of Architecture, Nantes (2009)
- Transformation de la tour Bois-le-Prêtre, Paris (2009); Équerre d'argent 2011
- Aménagement des friches du Palais de Tokyo, Paris (2012)
- FRAC Nord-Pas-de-Calais, Dunkerque (2013)
- Le Grand Sud, polyvalent hall, Lille (2013)
- GHI-Quartier du Grand Parc : transformation of 3 towers that had been slated for demolition, Bordeaux (2016)
