= Anne Lacaton =

French architect (born 1955)

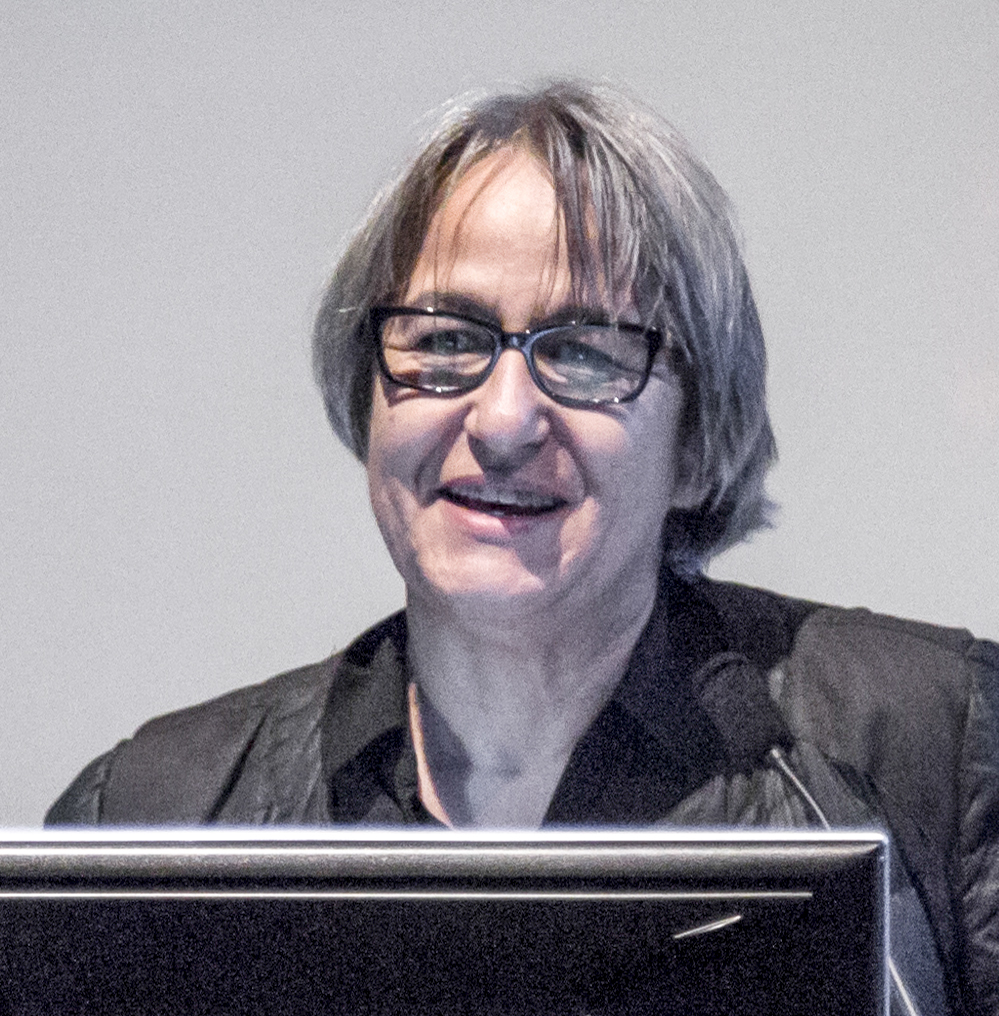
- Anne Lacaton in 2017
- Born: 2 August 1955 (age 71); Saint-Pardoux-la-Rivière
- Education: ENSAPBx
- Occupation: Architect
- Awards: Pritzker Prize (2021)
- Practice: Lacaton & Vassal
- Buildings: Grand Parc Bordeaux

Anne Lacaton (born 2 August 1955) is a French architect and educator. She runs the architectural practice Lacaton & Vassal, with Jean-Philippe Vassal. The pair were jointly awarded the 2021 Pritzker Prize.

== Early life and education ==
She was born in Saint-Pardoux-la-Rivière on 2 August 1955. Lacaton graduated in architecture from the École nationale supérieure d'architecture et de paysage de Bordeaux and received a master's degree in urban planning from the University of Bordeaux in 1984. Lacaton often visited Vassal in Niger, who worked there as an architect and town planner; they built their first joint project, a straw hut.

== Architectural practice ==
In 1987, Lacaton formed the practice Lacaton & Vassal, with Jean-Philippe Vassal. Initially based in Bordeaux, the practice moved to Paris in 2000. Lacaton & Vassal's work focuses on reduced-cost construction. Many projects are hybrids between a contemporary building concept and more diverse techniques, upsetting building contractors' standard practices.

The firm renovated the Palais de Tokyo contemporary art museum in Paris, completed in 2001. The project, a bare bones reclamation of an art deco building near the Seine, was short-listed for the EU Mies Award in 2003.

In 2005, Lacaton & Vassal and architect Frédéric Druot were selected to reshape the Tour Bois le Prêtre, a 17-story housing tower on Paris' northern edge designed by architect Raymond Lopez in 1957. The team cut away most of the thick façade's panels, installing balconies and large sliding windows in their place, opening the apartments to more natural light. The units were also enlarged and opened, and the firm installed new plumbing, bathrooms, ventilation, and electric systems. The project was a runner up in the Design of the Year award from the UK's Design Museum in 2013, coming top of the architecture category.

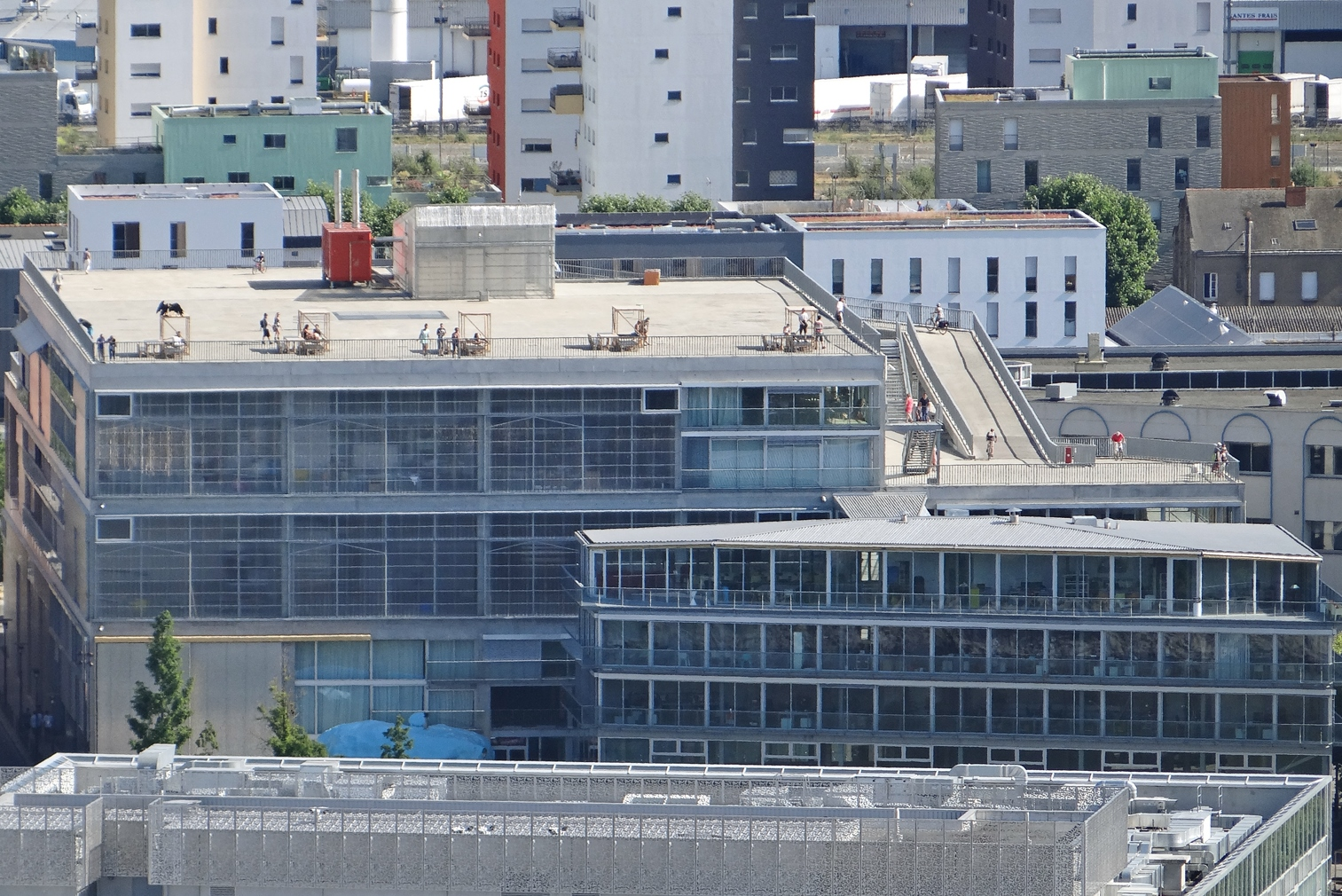
The School of Architecture, Nantes

The practice has also worked on the École Nationale Supérieure d'Architecture in Nantes; the art collection project FRAC Nord-Pas de Calais in Dunkirk; the Cap Ferret residential building in Cap Ferret, and the Grand Parc Bordeaux (with Frédéric Druot and Christophe Hutin). This last project was the winner of the EU Mies 2019 Award, for the best contemporary architecture in Europe.

Lacaton & Vassal have worked with Frederic Druot on sustainable housing projects, reinventing old 1960s era social housing in a project called Plus. Plus is an initiative to upgrade old social housing into better living spaces. They've published literature on the project.

== Academic career ==
Lacaton was visiting professor at the Higher Technical School of Architecture of Madrid (2007–13); EPFL (École Polytechnique Fédérale de Lausanne; 2004, 2006, 2010–11 and 2017–18); University of Florida (2012); State University of New York at Buffalo (2013); Pavillon Neuflize OBC-Palais de Tokyo, Paris (2013–14); and Harvard University. Lacaton was appointed as Associate Professor of Architecture & Design at ETH Zurich in 2017.

Her academic teaching focuses on an ideological and socio-political approach to architecture. Lacaton's designs and constructions support human use rather than iconic display, concerned with the people involved. Her designs aim to promote user participation, such as residents in areas undergoing redevelopment.

Anne Lacaton served as a jury member for The Daylight Award in 2020 and 2022.

== Awards ==
=== Lacaton & Vassal ===
- Lauréats des Albums de la Jeune Architecture, France – 1991
- Grand Prix National d'Architecture Jeune Talent, France – 1999
- Erich Schelling Award − 2006
- Fondation Erich Schelling, Karlsruhe Award "Sustainability and Residential Innovation", City of Madrid – 2006
- Royal Institute of British Architects International Fellowship in 2009.
- Grand prix national de l'architecture in 2008
- Paris, France Equerre d'Argent Award (with Frederic Druot) – 2011
- Paris Daylight & Building Components Award – 2011
- Design of the year, architecture category (with Frederic Druot) – 2013
- Rolf Schock Prize in the Visual Arts in 2014
- Life Time Achievement – Trienal de Arquitectura de Lisboa – 2016
- Académie de l'Architecture France – Gold Medal – 2016
- Simon Architecture Prize/ Fondation Mies Van der Rohe – The Living Places (with Frederic Druot) – 2016
- Heinrich Tessenow Medal in 2016
- Global Award for Sustainable Architecture (with Frederic Druot) in 2018
- Mies van der Rohe Award in 2019
- Großer BDA Preis (BDA Grand Prize) in 2020 for their life's work
- Pritzker Architecture Prize in 2021
- Soane Medal in 2023
- Jane Drew Prize for Architecture 2025

== See also ==
- Lacaton & Vassal
