= Soane Medal =

International architecture prize

- Current: Farshid Moussavi
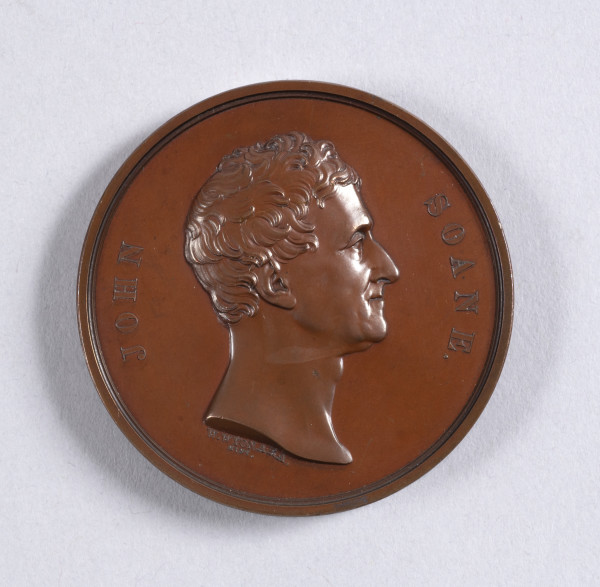
- Reverse
- Awarded for: Individuals who have made a major contribution to architecture
- First award: 2017; 9 years ago
- Website: www.soane.org/soane-medal
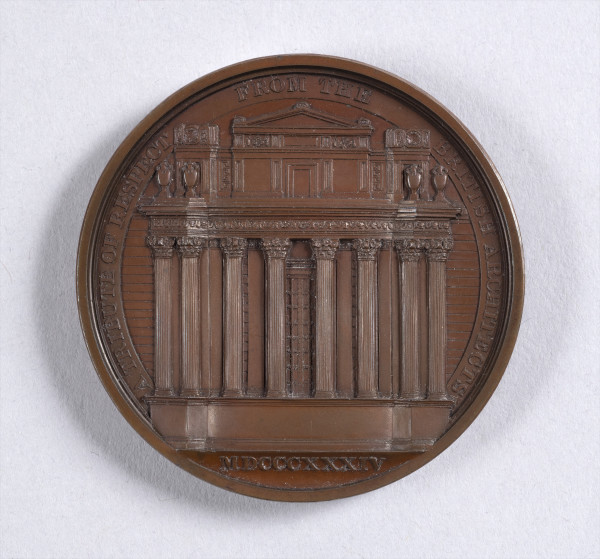
- Obverse

The Soane Medal, established in 2017, is an international award presented annually by Sir John Soane's Museum.

The prestigious Soane Medal honours architects, academics, and critics who have significantly advanced and enhanced public understanding of architecture through their work in practice, history, or theory.

The winner is selected annually by a panel of distinguished architects, critics and curators, initially led by former Trustee of Sir John Soane’s Museum, Sir David Chipperfield.

Madelon Vriesendorp, Dutch artist and co-founder of the Office of Metropolitan Architecture (OMA), was announced as the 2025 recipient of the illustrious Medal, which had previously been awarded to architects, engineers and theorists, but never before to an artist.

The recipient of the Medal delivers a lecture at a special event, open to all, and also receives a replica of the original gold medal presented to Sir John Soane by the ‘Architects of England’ in 1835. Modelled by Sir Francis Chantrey, the medal shows the likeness of Soane on one side and the north-west corner of the Bank of England on the other.

The Soane Medal is supported by Hamish and Sophie Forsyth.

== Medalists ==
Inaugural winner Rafael Moneo was cited for embodying "the idea of architecture as something that resides not just in the structure and the materials of a building, but in time and place, word and image, people and community".

Soane Medal winners
Year	Medalists	Nationality
2017	Rafael Moneo	Spain
2018	Denise Scott Brown	United States of America
2019	Kenneth Frampton	United Kingdom
2021	Marina Tabassum	Bangladesh
2022	Peter Barber	United Kingdom
2023	Anne Lacaton and Jean-Philippe Vassal	France
2024	Hanif Kara	Uganda, United Kingdom
2025	Madelon Vriesendorp	Netherlands
2026	Farshid Moussavi	Iran, United Kingdom
