= Stanislaus von Moos =

Swiss historian (born 1940)

- Born: 23 July 1940 (age 85); Lucerne, Switzerland
- Occupation: Historian

Stanislaus von Moos (born 23 July 1940) is a Swiss art historian and architectural theorist.

== Early life ==
Stanislaus von Moos was born in Lucerne, Switzerland.

== Career ==
After first teaching in Harvard, Bern and New York, he became a professor at the Delft University of Technology in 1983. He then worked at the newly created Department of Modern and Contemporary Art in Zurich, where he taught until his retirement in 2005. He then settled in Mendrisio, and currently teaches at Yale.

In 1971 he founded the still existing magazine " Archithese " . Since 1997 he was Visiting Professor Jean Labatut in Princeton.

He was awarded the Schelling Architecture Theory Prize for 1998.

== Personal life ==
Stanislaus von Moos is married to sculptor Irène von Moos. His uncle was the Lucerne painter Max von Moos.

== Bibliography ==
- Le Corbusier – elements of a synthesis, (1968), Le Corbusier, une synthèse, Marseille, Parenthèses, 2014
- The American architect Robert Venturi
- Published essay collection on Swiss architecture and art in the 20th Century
