= Jean-Philippe Vassal =

French architect (born 1954)

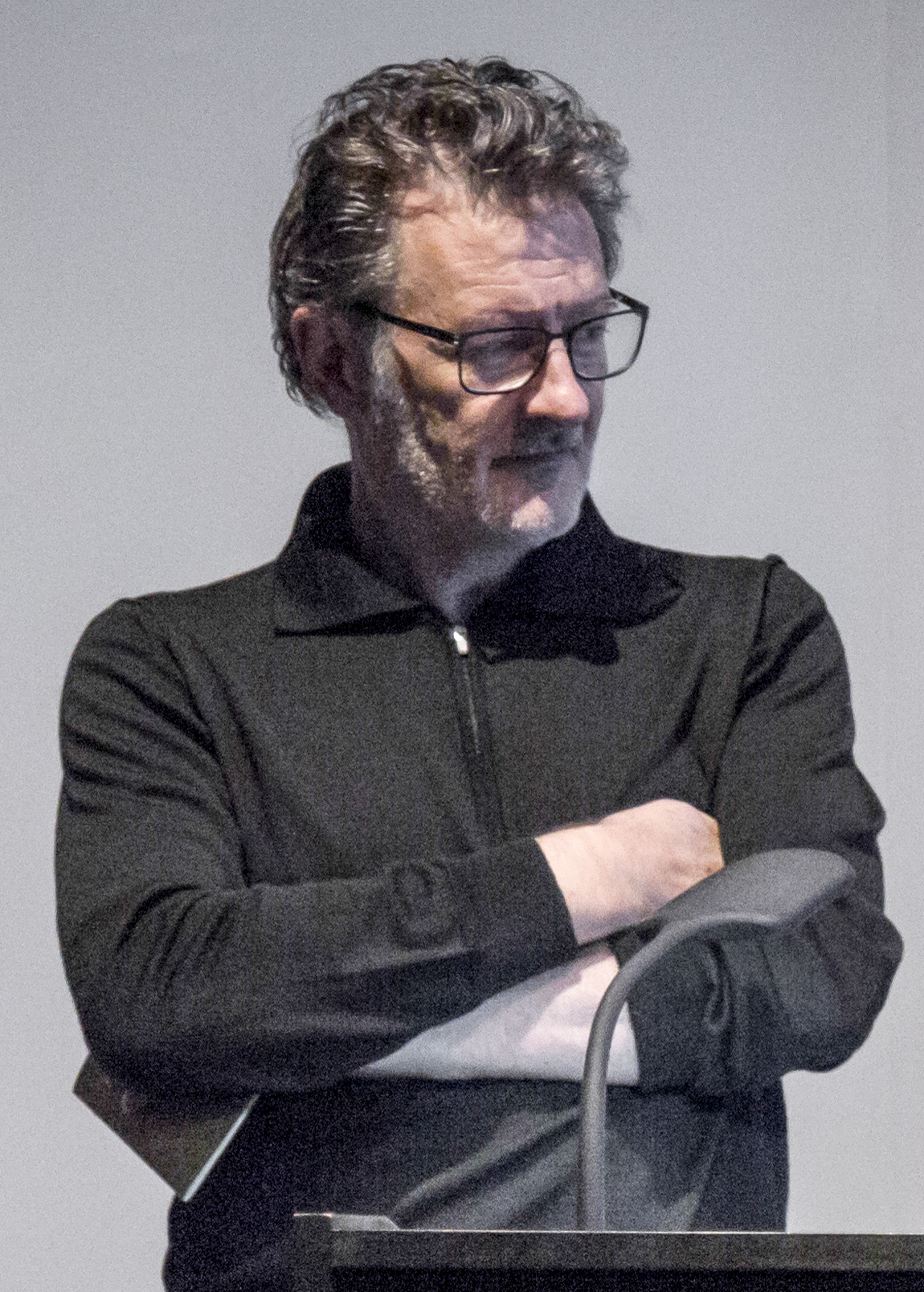
- Vassal in 2017
- Born: 22 February 1954 (age 72); Casablanca, French Morocco
- Education: ENSAPBx
- Occupation: Architect
- Awards: Pritzker Prize (2021)
- Practice: Lacaton & Vassal
- Buildings: Grand Parc Bordeaux

Jean-Philippe Vassal (French pronunciation: [ʒɑ̃filip vasal]; born 22 February 1954) is a French architect and academic. He runs the architectural practice Lacaton & Vassal, with Anne Lacaton. The pair were jointly awarded the 2021 Pritzker Architecture Prize.

== Early life and education ==
Vassal was born 1954 in Casablanca during the French Protectorate of Morocco. He graduated from the École nationale supérieure d'architecture et de paysage de Bordeaux in 1980. After graduating, he spent five years in Niger as an architect and town planner.

== Architectural practice ==
Vassal founded the practice Lacaton & Vassal with Anne Lacaton in Bordeaux in 1987, which moved to Paris in 2000. The work of Lacaton & Vassal focuses on reduced-cost construction. Lacaton & Vassel carried out many international projects in the area of housing. They accomplish the high-profile renovation of the Palais de Tokyo in Paris.

In 2019 the Grand Parc Bordeaux (with Frédéric Druot and Christophe Hutin) was selected winner of the European Union's 2019 Mies van der Rohe Award, for the best contemporary architecture in Europe.

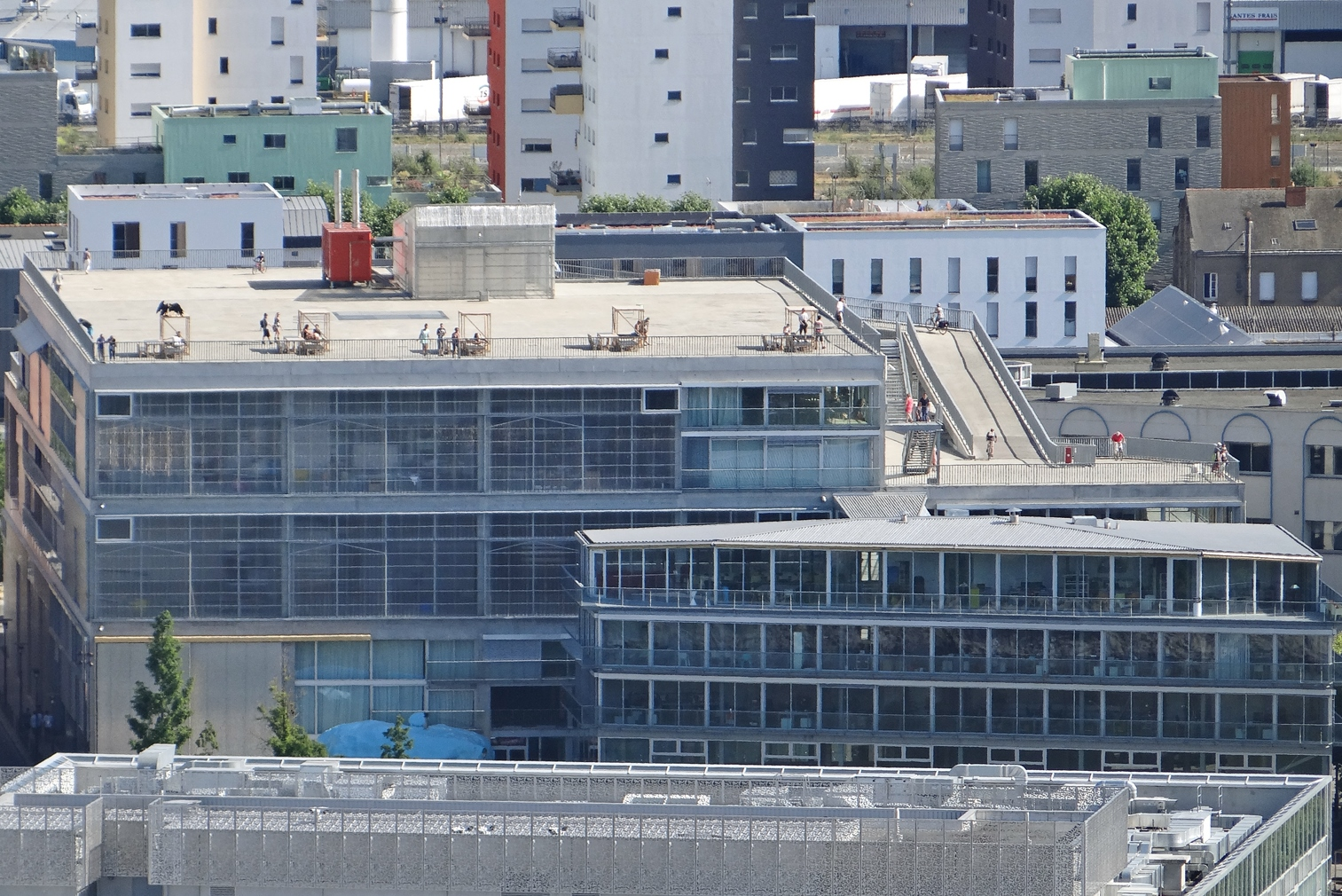
The School of Architecture, Nantes

The French architects, who are based in the Paris suburb of Montreuil, believe that every structure can be repurposed, reinvented, reinvigorated.

== Academic career ==
Vassal has been visiting professor at institutes such as the Architecture School of Versailles (2002–2006), the École Polytechnique Fédérale de Lausanne (EPF Lausanne; 2010–2011), the Technische Universität Berlin (TU Berlin; 2007–2010) and Universität der Künste Berlin (UDK Berlin; 2012–2022).

== Awards and honours: Lacaton & Vassal ==
- 1991: Lauréats des Albums de la Jeune Architecture, France
- 1999: Grand Prix National d'Architecture Jeune Talent, France
- 2006: Schelling Architecture Award, Germany
- 2006: Sustainability and innovation in housing, Erich Schelling Foundation
- 2008: Grand Prix National d'Architecture
- 2009: French International Fellow of the Royal Institute of British Architects
- 2011: Paris Daylight & Building Components Award
- 2011: Prix de l'Équerre d'Argent (with Frédéric Druot)
- 2014: Rolf Schock Prize, Fine arts category
- 2016: Simon Architecture Prize/ Fondation Mies Van der Rohe – The Living Places (with Frederic Druot)
- 2016: Life Time Achievement – Trienal de Arquitectura de Lisboa
- 2016: Gold medal of the Académie d'architecture
- 2016: Heinrich Tessenow Medal, Germany
- 2019: Mies van der Rohe Prize
- 2020: Großer BDA Preis (BDA Grand Prize) for their life's work
- 2021: Pritzker Prize
- 2023: Soane Medal

== See also ==
- Lacaton & Vassal
