= Volksbank Bielefeld-Gütersloh =

German bank

Coordinates: 51.909135°N 8.384591°E

Volksbank Bielefeld-Gütersloh eG
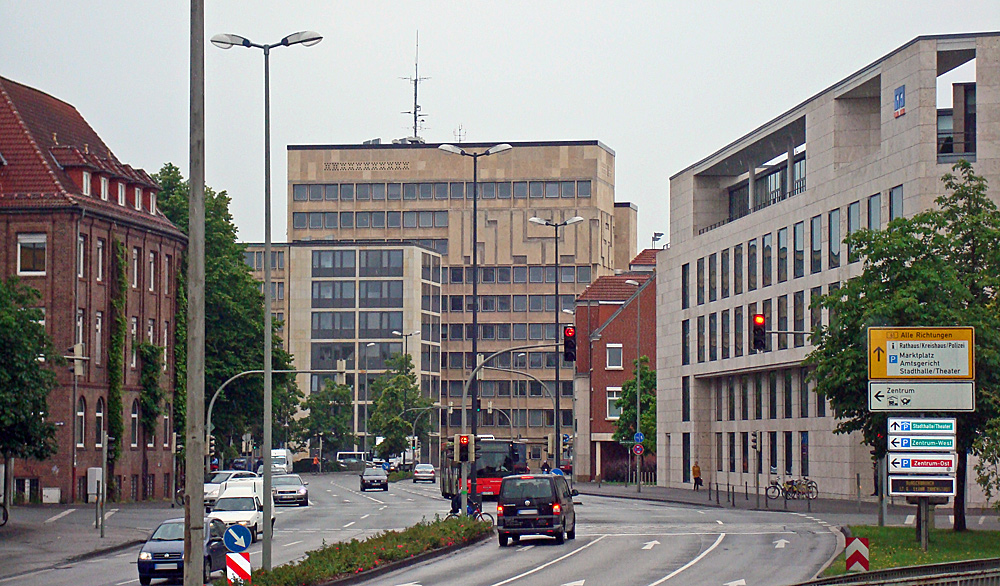
- View of the Gütersloh town hall, on the right the Volksbank headquarters built in 2004
- Type: Registered cooperative society
- Industry: Cooperative bank
- Founded: 1892; 134 years ago
- Headquarters: Gütersloh, Germany
- Total assets: €4.44 billion (2018)
- Members: 109,600 (2018)
- Number of employees: 747 (2018)
- Website: www.volksbank-bi-gt.de

The Volksbank Bielefeld-Gütersloh eG is a German regional cooperative bank based in the East Westphalian district town of Gütersloh. As of 2018, it had a balance sheet total of €4.44 billion, the third-largest Volksbank in North Rhine-Westphalia, and with 108,600 members, the largest association of individuals in the Ostwestfalen-Lippe region. The bank emerged from the merger of the Volksbank Gütersloh with the smaller Bielefelder Volksbank on May 22, 2014.

The Volksbank Bielefeld-Gütersloh's branches and self-service terminals are located in Bielefeld, Gütersloh, Rheda-Wiedenbrück, Verl (excluding Kaunitz), Steinhagen, Herzebrock, Schloß Holte-Stukenbrock, Rietberg-Bokel, Langenberg-Benteler and Versmold-Peckeloh. Two self-service terminals are located in corporate buildings of Bertelsmann.

== History ==
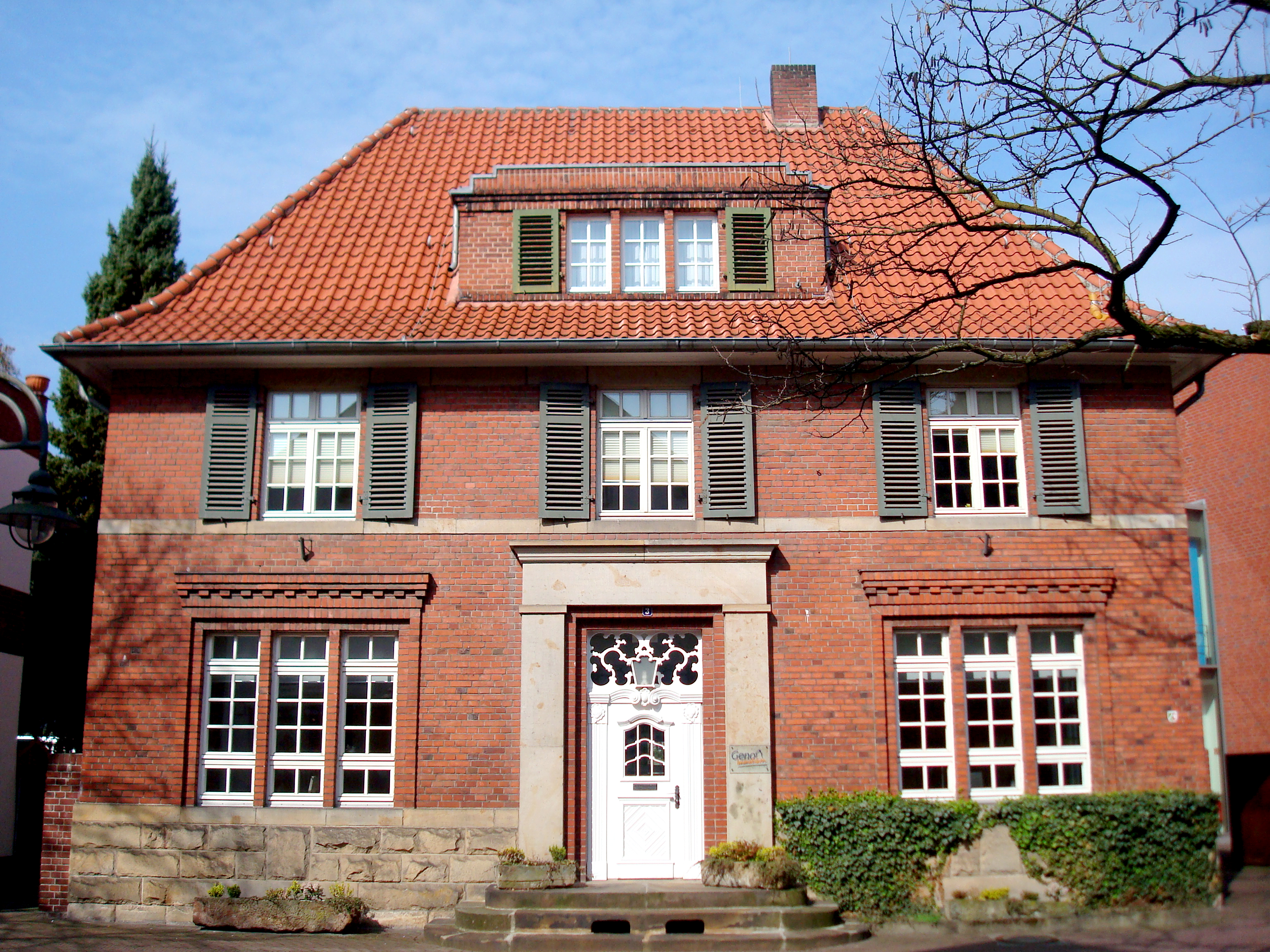
Former Volksbank headquarters (built 1933) in Moltkestraße, today the headquarters of Volksbank subsidiary Geno Immobilien

In 1892, 77 cooperative members founded the Gütersloh Spar- und Leihbank e.G.m.b.H with 14,110 Mark start-up capital, to whose founders and supervisory board members the mayor and later honorary citizen of Gütersloh, Emil Mangelsdorf, belonged. Ten years later, in 1902, the bank counted 414 and 1912 already 967 cooperative members. 1910 it was renamed to Gütersloher Bank eGmbH, from 1942 the bank operated under the name Volksbank Gütersloh eGmbH.

In 1886, the Gütersloh Spar- und Darlehenskassenverein eGmbH was founded. In 1933, the bank merged with the Kattenstrother Spar- und Darlehenskassenverein, founded in 1899, to become the Gütersloher Spar- und Darlehenskasse eGmbH, which was converted into an eG in 1963. In 1988, the Gütersloher und the Spar- und Darlehenskasse Avenwedde, which was founded in 1886, merged.

Finally, in 1990, these two "original strands" of the bank, Gütersloh Spar- und Darlehenskasse eG and Volksbank Gütersloh eGmbH, merged to form Volksbank Gütersloh eG. This was followed by mergers with the Spar- und Darlehenskasse Isselhorst (1996), with the Volksbank Rheda-Wiedenbrück (1999), with the Volksbanken Steinhagen and Peckeloh (both 2003) and with the Verler Volksbank (2004).

In 2004, the new headquarters of the Volksbank, planned by the Frankfurt office Turkali Architekten, was built on a plot of almost 6,000 m^{2} opposite the Gütersloh main railway station. Two years later the Volksbank Foundation was founded, which promotes voluntary work by citizens in the business area of Volksbank Bielefeld-Gütersloh eG.

In April 2011, the bank and Stadtwerke Gütersloh founded the energy cooperative GrünEnergie eG, which finances projects for ecological energy generation. That same year the bank celebrated its 125th anniversary. In November, she opened the "Bankery", a mixture of Volksbank branch and restaurant / café / bar, in cooperation with a local restaurateur in central Gütersloh downtown. Also in 2011, the Volksbank Gütersloh set up its first drive-in ATM at a branch in Spexard.

In 2014, the Volksbank Gütersloh merged with Bielefeld Volksbank. In the previous year, the Volksbank Gütersloh had a balance sheet total of € 2,201 million, deposits of €1,688 million, 561 employees and 62,983 members recorded. Bielefeld Volksbank had 37,206 members at the time of the merger.

In October 2016, the Volksbank Bielefeld-Gütersloh and Volksbank e.G. (Warendorf) announced a cooperation that was meant to lead to a merger in 2018. However, the merger negotiations were stopped again in March 2017 after having had different views regarding the merger.

== Organizational structure ==
The most important organs of the Volksbank Bielefeld-Gütersloh eG are the Management Board, the Supervisory Board and the Representatives' Meeting. The representatives are elected by the members.

== See also ==
- List of banks in Germany
