= Ningbo Museum =

Museum in Ningbo, Zhejiang, China

Ningbo Museum 宁波博物馆
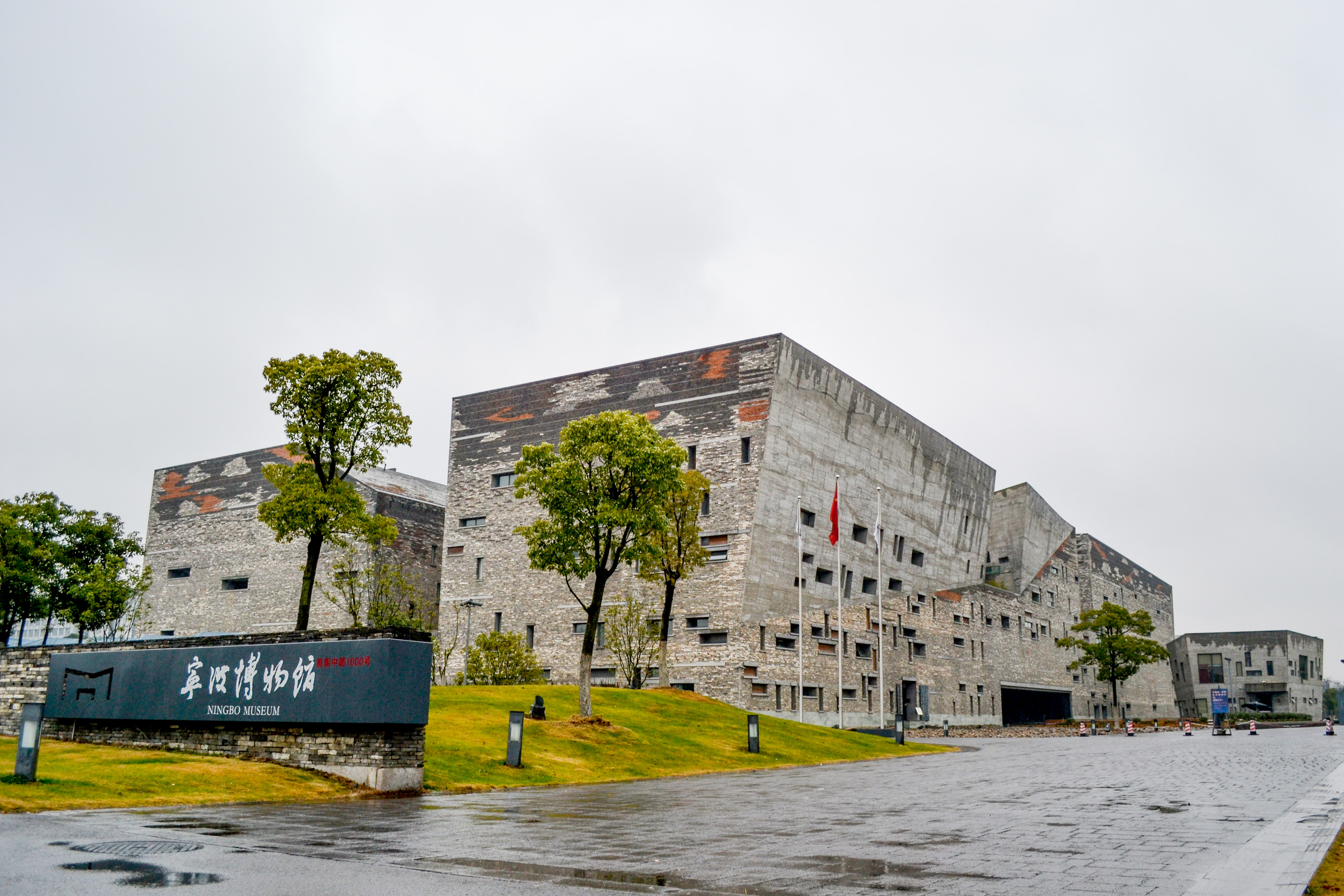
- Established: December 5, 2008
- Location: Yinzhou District, Ningbo, China
- Coordinates: 29.817336°N 121.541178°E
- Website: www.nbmuseum.cn

Ningbo Museum
- Traditional Chinese: 寧波博物館
- Simplified Chinese: 宁波博物馆
Transcriptions

The Ningbo Museum (Chinese: 宁波博物馆), also known as the Yinzhou Museum (Chinese: 鄞州博物馆) or the Ningbo Historic Museum (Chinese: 宁波历史博物馆), is a museum in the city of Ningbo in Zhejiang Province, China. It is located in Yinzhou District and opened on December 5, 2008. The museum focuses on Ningbo area history and traditional customs.

== Architecture ==
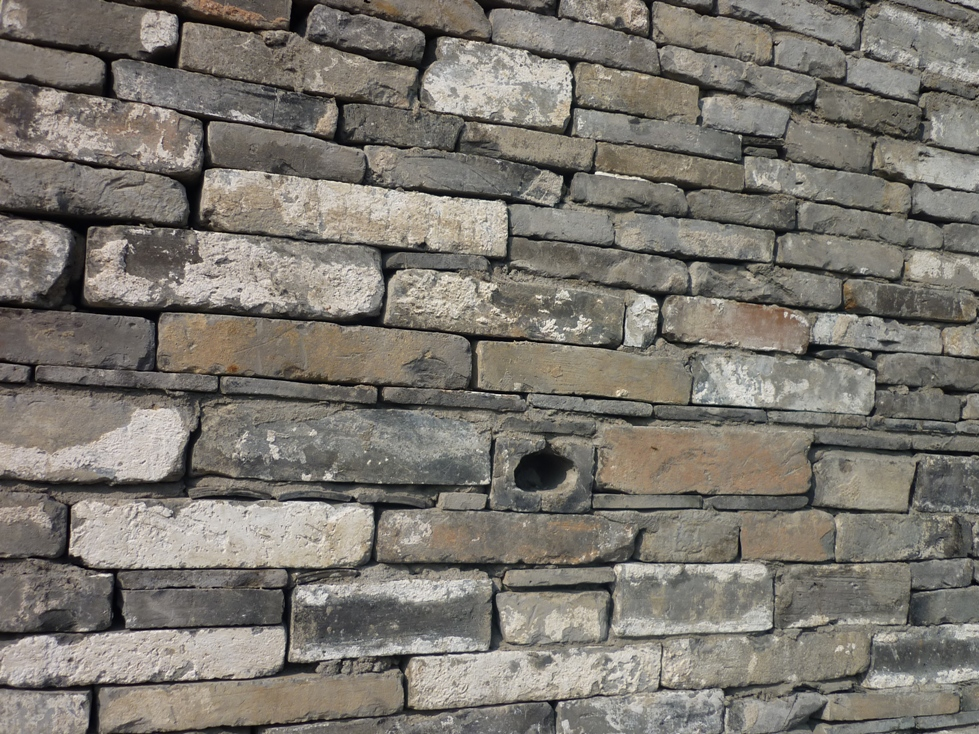
Wall detail, made of old tiles

Ningbo Museum was designed by Wang Shu, the first Chinese citizen to win the Pritzker Architecture Prize in 2012. The design is a conceptual combination of mountains, water and oceans. design through decorations made from old tiles and bamboo.The Eastern China Sea and the Siming mountains surround the Museum and are referenced in its design and construction.

Materials

Materiality, or the materials used to construct a building, is a major aspect of the design and construction of the History Museum, as emphasized by Wang Shu. After a period of rapid growth in the wake of the Treaty of Nanjing, many traditional buildings were demolished in order to create space for new construction. In Wang Shu's design process, he was dedicated to using sustainable practice and materials.

After collecting stones and bricks from demolished structures in the surrounding area, the architect gave the builders some freedom in arranging these to create walls, using the wapan technique. This involves piecing together mismatched pieces of stone or tile with thin layers of lime (similar to concrete), creating a strong but flexible connection between individual pieces. This practice was used historically to rebuild villages after typhoons swept through the region. Wang Shu was adamant on using this building technique as it maintains the practice of traditional Chinese construction, recalling the history of his and the project's home.

Other walls are decorated with cement-covered bamboos. Material used on different walls was decided by the angle at which the wall protrudes. More angular walls employed bamboo and concrete construction, and more vertical walls used the recycled brick and stone. It is reported that Ningbo Museum was the first museum built with a large number of used materials. Ningbo Tengtou Pavilion in Shanghai World Expo also employed a similar decoration. Additionally, the windows have received attention for their unique situation on each facade and the seemingly random arrangement and placement of each window.

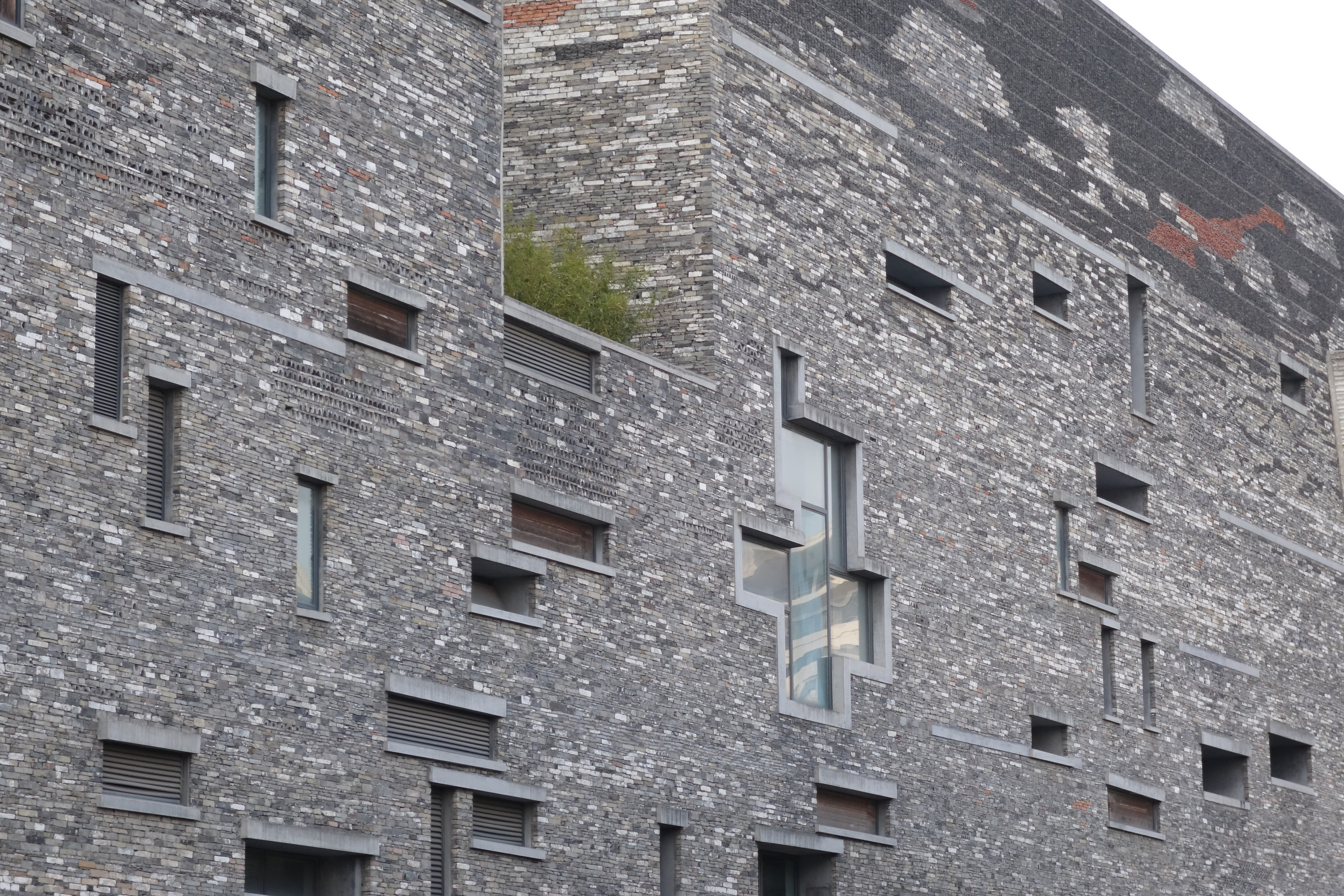
Facade of the Ningbo Museum showing window arrangement.

Design

The entire structure of the museum is broken into a few separate pieces that are connected via the central courtyard. The first three levels create a united square, housing the main entrances and administrative offices. Galleries are housed on the upper levels.

These upper levels fracture, like the mountains near the site, breaking into five smaller sections of sharp geometric shapes. The effect is created through a series of staircases and courtyards that create many different paths through the museum. This cracking effect can be seen in the plan from the bird's eye view, and the angles at which each piece jut out from the main levels creates an abstract sculptural effect on the rooftop walkways.

Public Reception

Ningbo Museum won the Lu Ban Prize in 2009, the top architecture prize in China.

There was some criticism of the architect and his choice to use hundred-year-old materials for new construction. Opponents of using these materials noted that the town of Ningbo was moving towards a more modern aesthetic, and that this museum would keep them in the past. Ultimately, many visitors noted that the materials created a connection between the new museum and the history of the region, reflecting the interior purpose of this historical museum.

== Permanent exhibits ==
=== Ningbo history exhibit ===
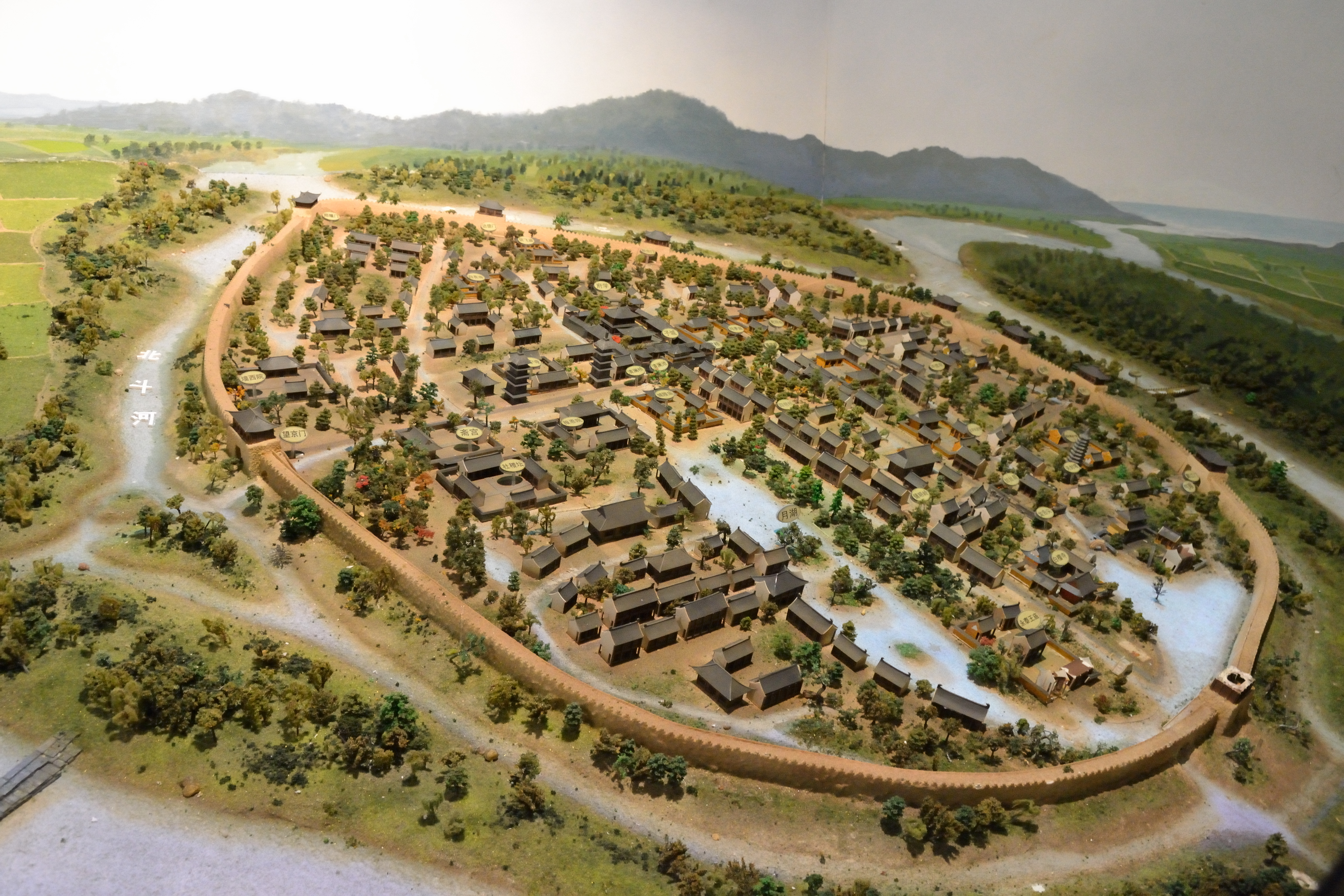
Model of Ningbo city in Tang Dynasty

Located on the second floor of the museum, this is the main exhibit of the museum, showing the history of Ningbo from the Hemudu culture until the Republic of China. Major stories are about ancient cultures, the expansion of the city, overseas commerce, the development of Eastern Zhejiang Scholars and Ningbo Commercial Group. Large amount of artefacts, historic photographs and models are displayed.

=== Ningbo custom exhibit ===
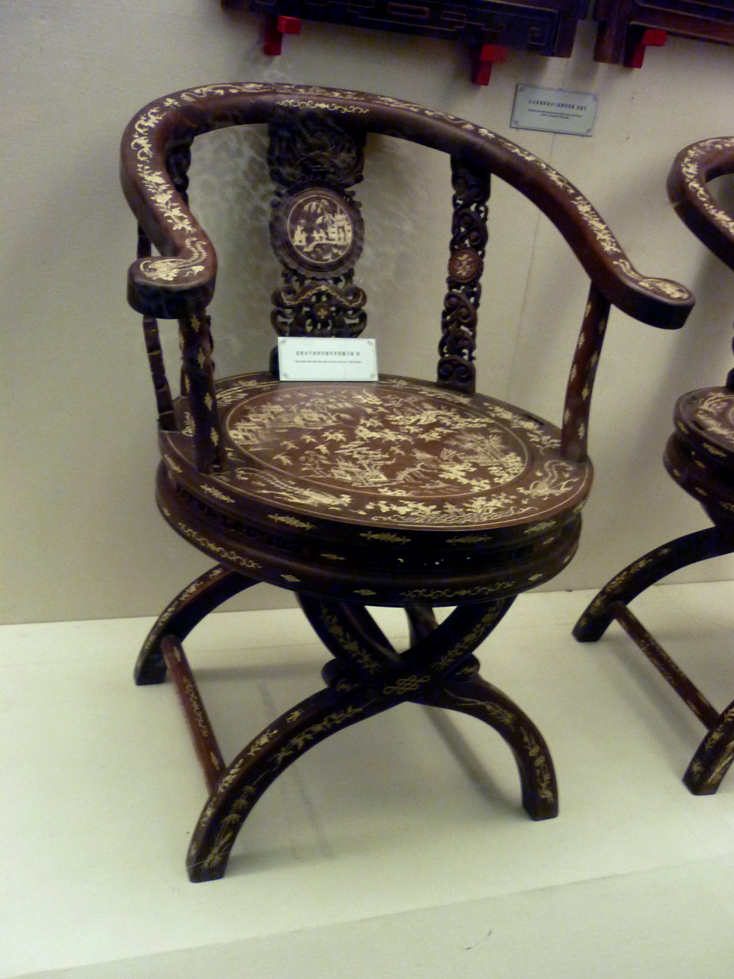
Carved chair with stylized bone inlay, made in Ningbo in Qing Dynasty

This exhibit is located on the third floor of the museum. Wax models and mock buildings and modern electronic techniques are used to show a traditional commercial street in Ningbo. Intangible cultural heritages of the city are also on display.

=== Bamboo art exhibit ===
This exhibit is located on the third floor of the museum, displaying old bamboo artefacts donated by Qin Bingnian, the son of the collector, Qin Kangxiang.

== Li Yuan Photography Arts Museum ==
The Li Yuan Photography Arts Museum, also designed by Wang Shu using materials similar to the main Ningbo Museum, opened on September 28, 2013 as a separate pavilion of 1,000 square meters space primarily used for temporary photography exhibits. It is located in the Wu San Fang on the north gate of Luzhou Park. and is named after Chinese photographer Li Yuan who was born in Ningbo.
