= DZI (company) =

Company based in Bulgaria

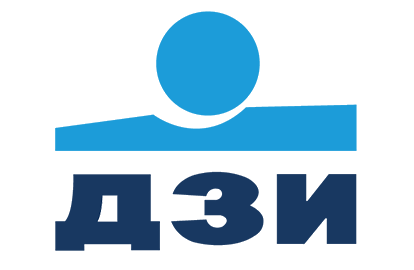

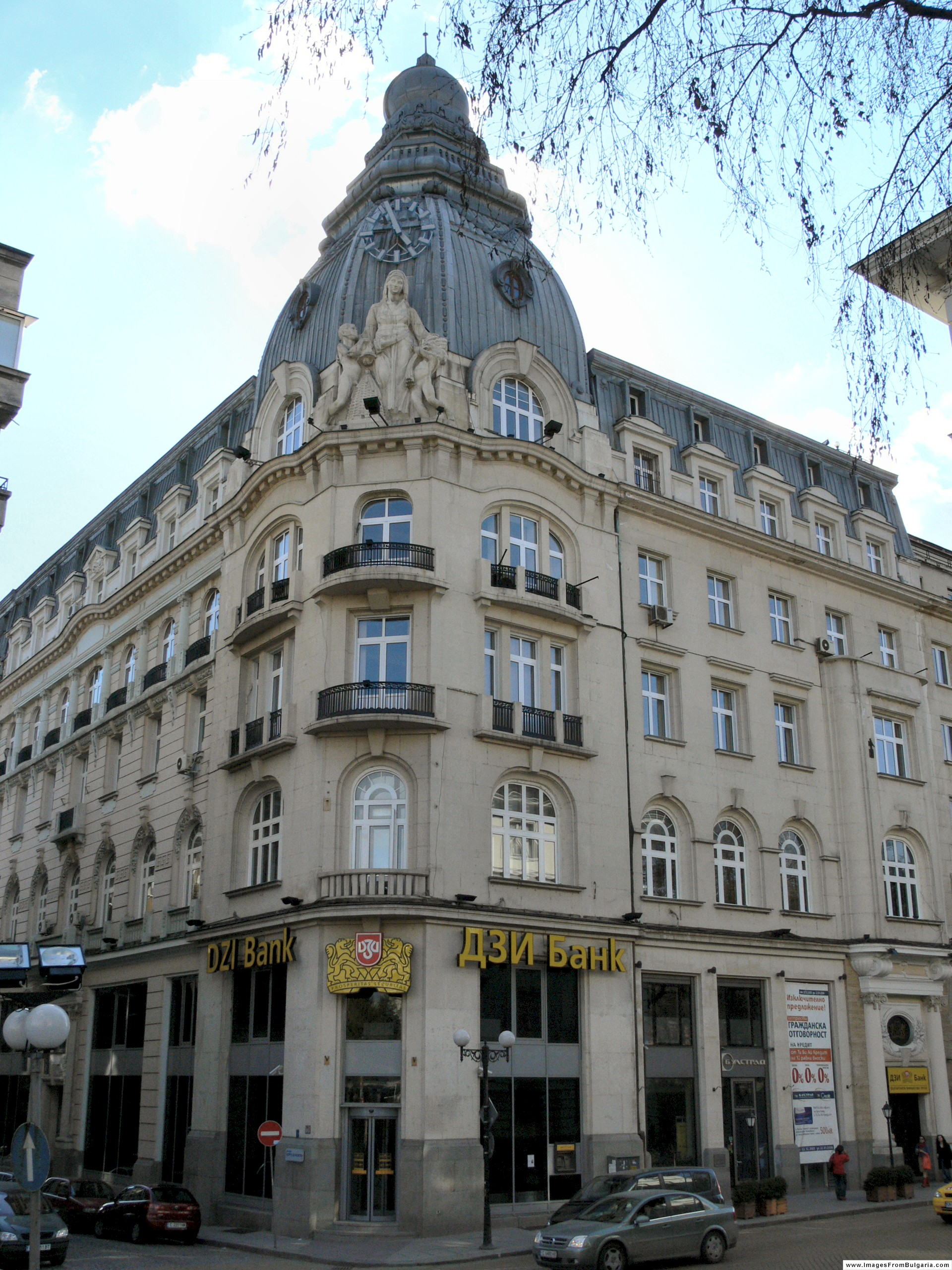
- Native name: ДЗИ
- Type: Public
- Industry: Financial services; Insurance
- Founded: June 27, 1946; 80 years ago
- Founder: Government of Bulgaria
- Headquarters: Sofia, Bulgaria
- Products: Life insurance; Provident Funds
- Number of employees: 900
- Website: www.dzi.bg

DZI (Bulgarian: Държавният застрахователен институт) is the company with the longest experience on the Bulgarian insurance market, founded in 1946. The company is a leader on the insurance market in Bulgaria and has been part of the Belgian banking and insurance group КВС since 2007. DZI develops and offers a full range of products in the General Insurance and Life Insurance domains, as well as such, related to coverage of health-related risks. Over the years DZI experts have devised dozens of innovative product portfolio and customer services.

== History ==
DZI was founded on June 27, 1946 with the nationalization of Insurance Companies and State Monopoly on Insurance Act was adopted. In 1992 the company became one of the co-founders of the Association of Bulgarian Insurers. In October 1998, DZI was transformed into a sole-owner joint stock company with a 100% participation of the State. On 10 October 2002, the General Meeting of Shareholders made a decision to rename на State Insurance Institute – DZI EAD (sole-owner joint stock company) into DZI AD (joint stock company). On 3 August 2007, KBC obtained the relevant approval of the regulatory authorities and successfully finalized the acquisition of DZI Insurance and Reinsurance Joint –Stock Company. Thereby, becoming part of Belgian banking and insurance group KBC, DZI gained support at international level.

== Products ==
DZI building in Varna

- Motor insurance
- Property insurance
- Health insurance
- Travel insurance
- Life insurance
- Life insurance with savings components
- Accident insurance
- Agricultural insurance
- Transport insurance
