= Kongresszentrum Karlsruhe =

Congress centre in Germany

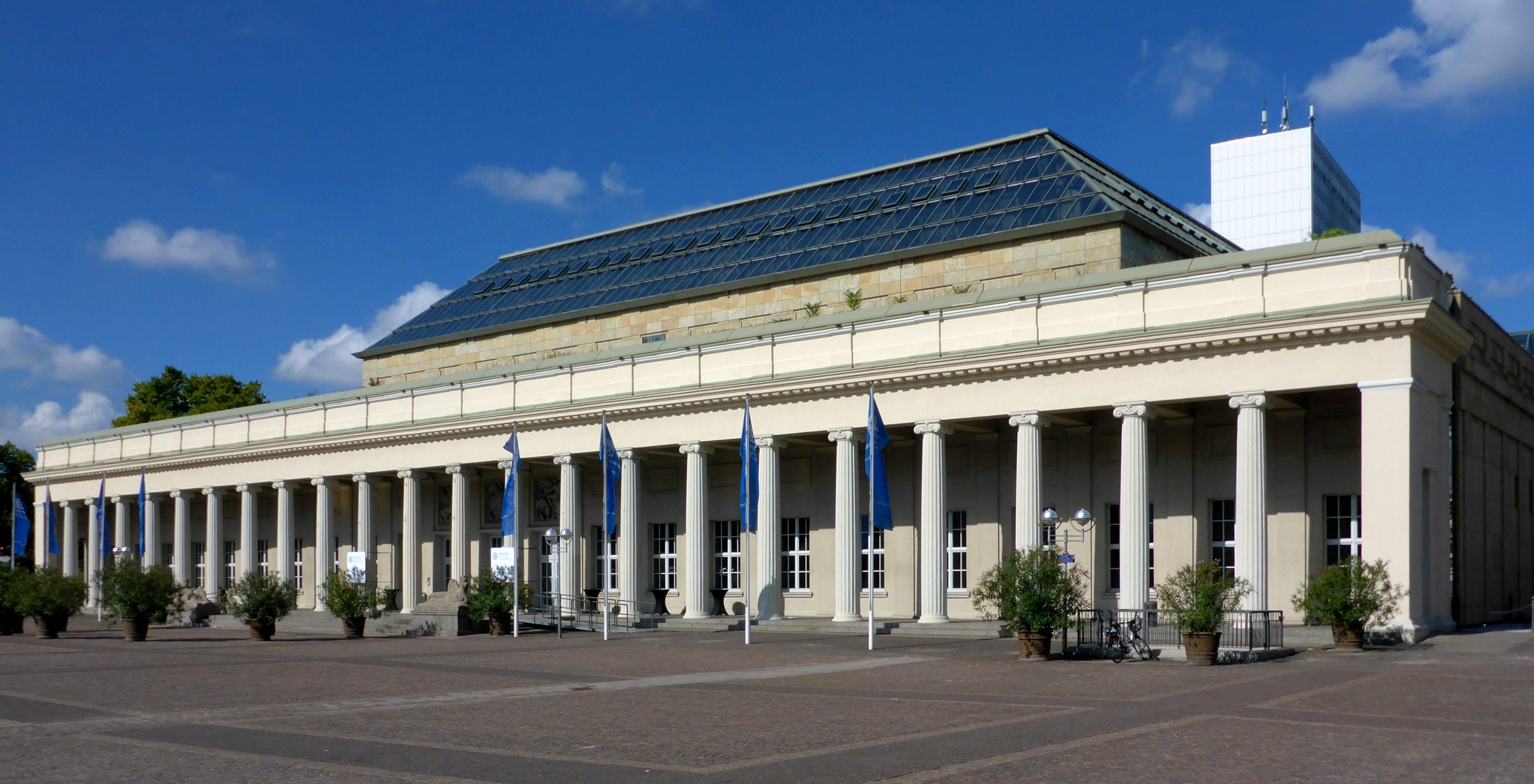
- Stadthalle
- Interactive map of Kongresszentrum Karlsruhe
- Location: Karlsruhe, Baden-Württemberg, Germany
- Coordinates: 49.0027°N 8.4013°E
- Operator: Karlsruher Messe- und Kongress GmbH
- Type: Congress centre

The Kongresszentrum Karlsruhe (Karlsruhe Congress Centre), located in Karlsruhe, Baden-Württemberg, Germany is the largest inner-city congress centre in Germany, operated by Karlsruher Messe- und Kongress GmbH. It is located within walking distance of the main railway station and comprises about 20,000 m^{2} (220,000 sq ft) of exhibition space in four halls arranged around the 10,000 m^{2} (110,000 sq ft) Festplatz.

The congress centre consists of the Stadthalle, the Konzerthaus, the Schwarzwaldhalle and the Gartenhalle. The centrepiece of the convention centre, the Stadthalle, has been under renovation and closed since mid-2017.

== Building ==
=== Stadthalle ===
The Stadthalle (Town hall) has five event halls for 4,000 people, five conference rooms as well as 17 seminar rooms and 3 foyers with a total area of 6,000 m^{2} (65,000 sq ft). The listed portico was taken over from its predecessor, originally built in 1915 by Robert Curjel and Karl Moser as an exhibition hall. The current Stadthalle, built according to plans by Herman Rotermund and Christine Rotermund-Lehmbruck as Haus im Haus, was opened in 1985.

Until the opening of the Messe Karlsruhe in 2003, the congress centre was also used to hold trade and public fairs. Among other things, the large regional trade fair Offerta and the Learntec were held here. In 1980, the founding party conference of the Alliance 90/The Greens was held in the Stadthalle.

=== Konzerthaus ===
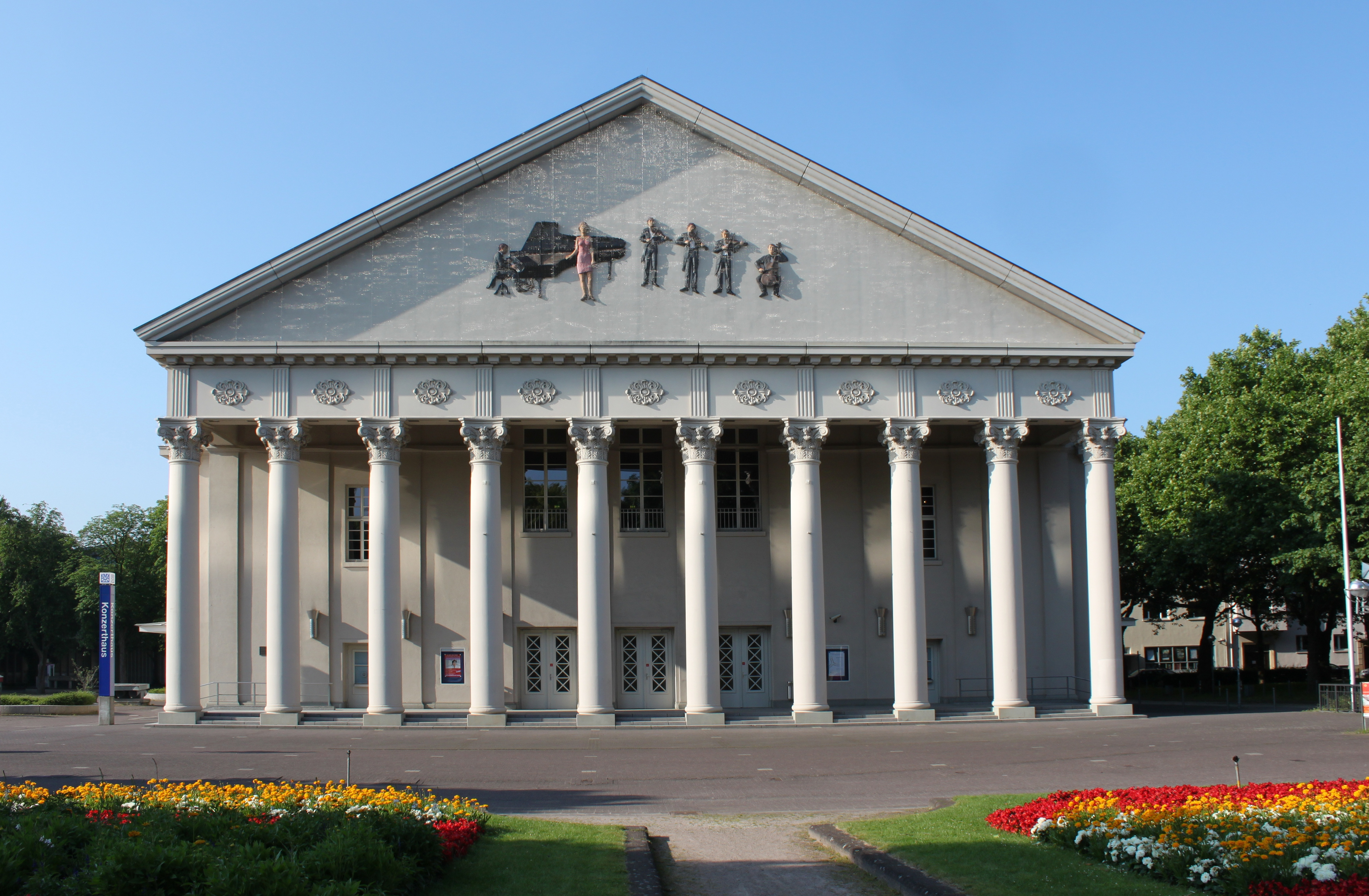
Konzerthaus

The neoclassical Konzerthaus (Concert house) was built between 1913 and 1915 according to plans by the architects Robert Curjel and Karl Moser. The listed hall has a large and a small hall as well as three seminar rooms and two foyers.

The Säulenportikus, destroyed in World War II, was not restored until 1993/94. Since 1996, a concert scene by Stephan Balkenhol with six musicians made of glazed ceramics has replaced the relief Birth of Venus originally mounted in the pediment. After the destruction of the theatre at Schlossplatz in 1944 and until the opening of the new building at Ettlinger Tor in 1975, the Konzerthaus served as a temporary venue for the Badisches Staatstheater Karlsruhe;

=== Schwarzwaldhalle ===
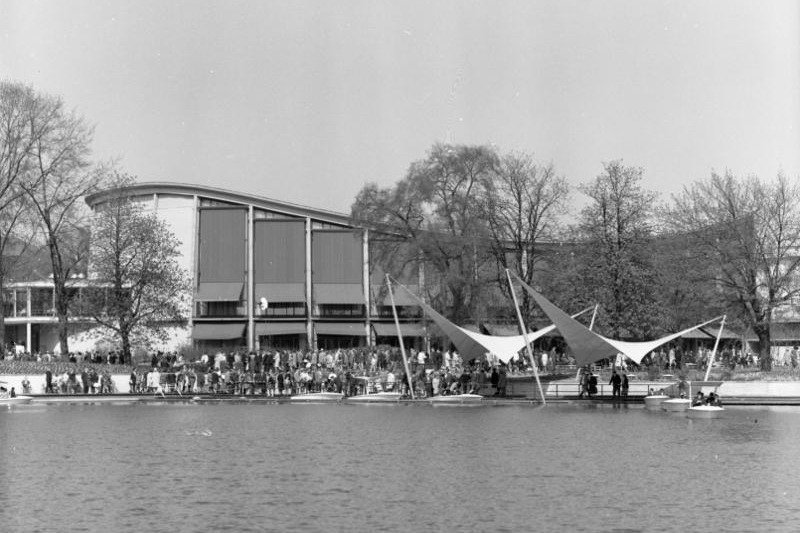
Schwarzwaldhalle

The listed Schwarzwaldhalle (Black Forest hall) was designed by Erich Schelling and Ulrich Finsterwalder and opened on 19 August 1953 after only six months of construction. Remarkable is the hall's cantilevered suspended roof consisting of a six-centimetre-thick concrete "shell" (tensile structure), which was the first to be built in such a size and attracted worldwide attention among experts. Inside, there is 2,575 m^{2} (27,720 sq ft) of column-free exhibition space, with alternative seating for up to 3,500 Septermner people. The Schwarzwaldhalle is connected to the Gartenhalle. retrieved 15 September 2021.

=== Gartenhalle ===
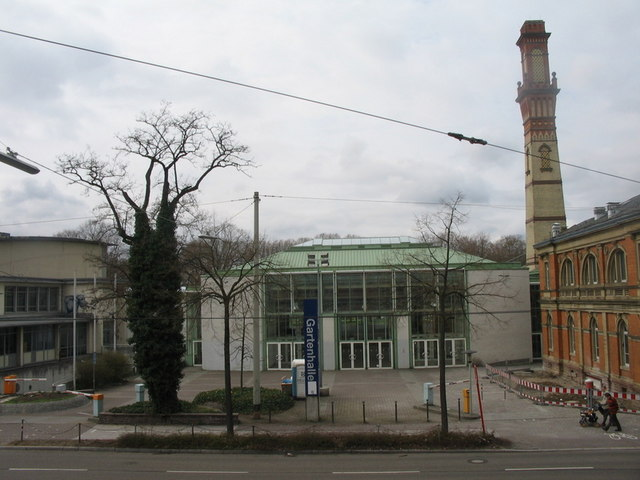
Gartenhalle

The Gartenhalle (Garden hall) offers 5,000 m^{2} (54,000 sq ft) of space, has a ceiling height of up to 10 metres (33 ft) and a very high floor load capacity, making it suitable for exhibitions of heavy machinery. It was opened in 1990 on the site of a previous building and is thus the newest hall of the congress centre. The listed chimney of an old combined heat and power plant is integrated into the building.
