= Nanjing Institute of Technology =

Provincial public college in Nanjing, Jiangsu, China

The Nanjing Institute of Technology (NJIT; Chinese: 南京工程学院) is a provincial public college in Nanjing, Jiangsu, China. The university is affiliated with the Province of Jiangsu and sponsored by the provincial government.

The college was established in June 2000 by the merger of Nanjing Mechanical Higher Vocational School (南京机械高等专科学校) and Nanjing Electric Power Higher Vocational School (南京电力高等专科学校).

== Academics ==
NIT is accredited with confer bachelor's and master's degrees. The school offers programs in disciplines including engineering, science, management, and arts.
