= École nationale supérieure d'architecture et de paysage de Bordeaux =

French architecture school

Coordinates: 44.7936°N 0.6035°W

The École nationale supérieure d'architecture et de paysage de Bordeaux (ENSAPBx) is a French school which provides training leading to the national diploma of architect, as well as the State diploma of landscape gardener (DEP). The school is located in Talence.
