= Mass stone =

Mass stone can refer to either:

- Massive precut stone, a stonemasonry method
- Mass rock, an altar rock in Ireland
