= Massive precut stone =

Type of stonemasonry used in construction

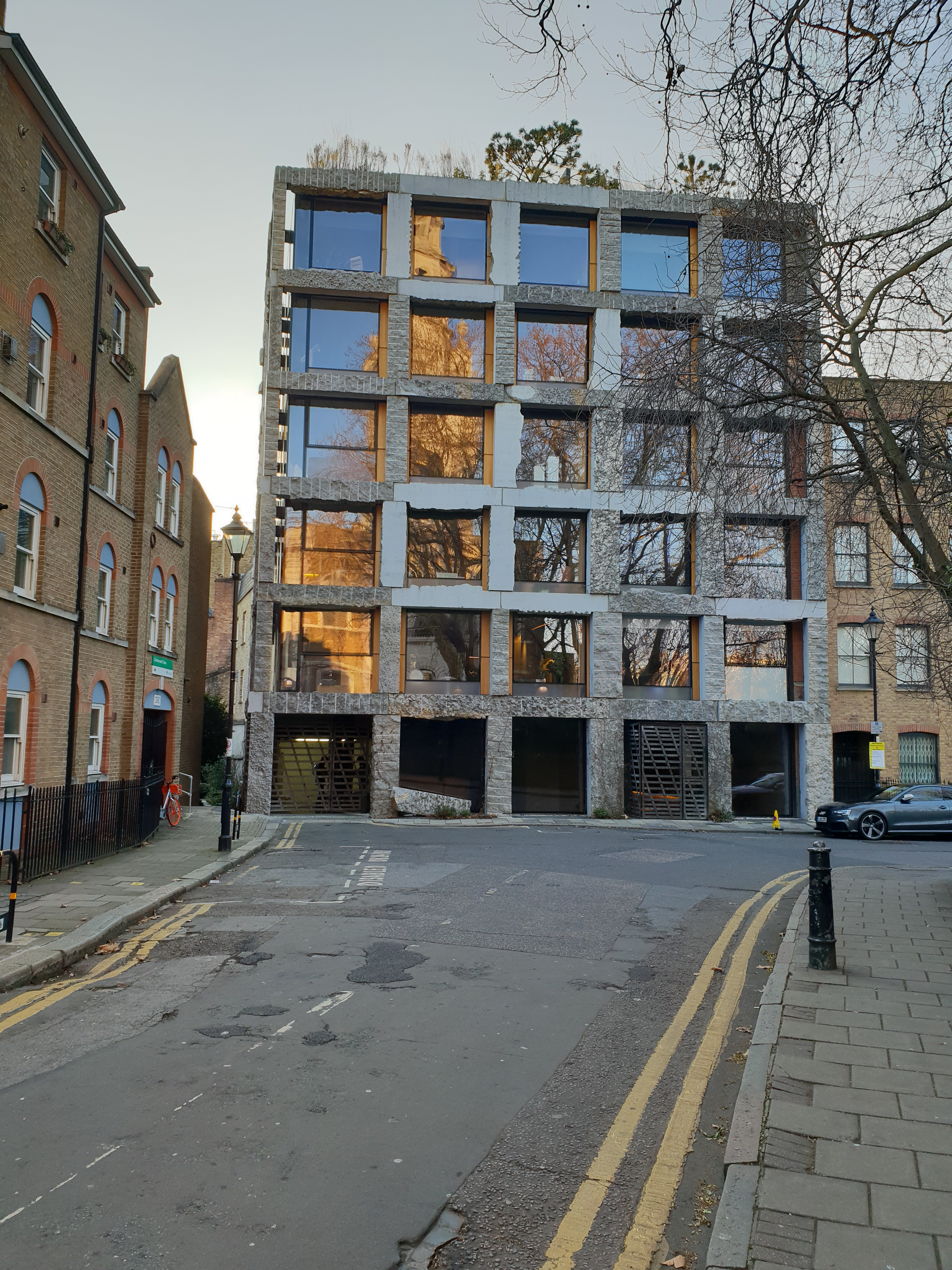
15 Clerkenwell Close in London uses a massive-precut stone exoskeleton.

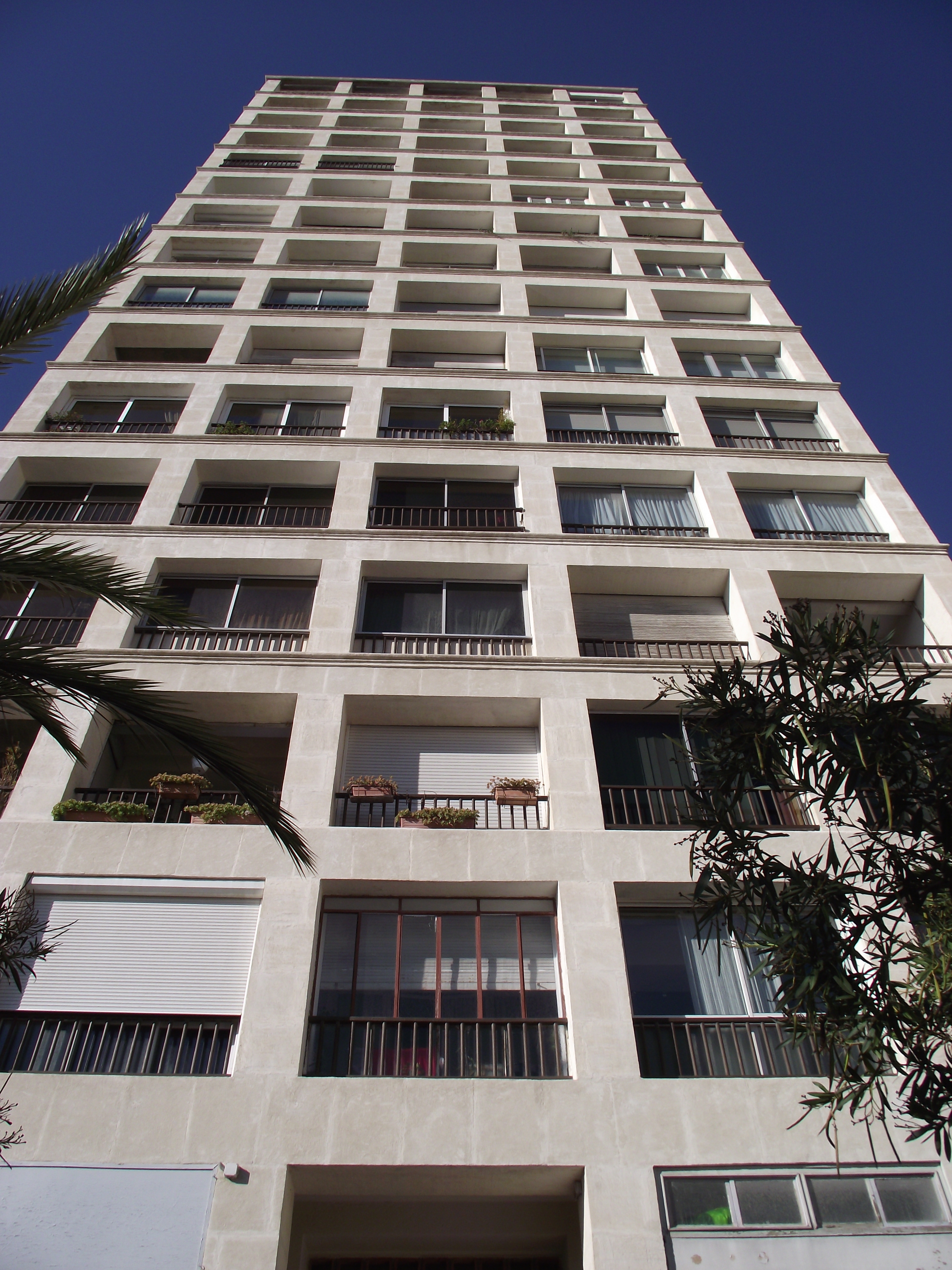
The first load-bearing stone skyscraper, 2 Rue Saint-Laurent, a 16-storey apartment building in Marseille, built from massive-precut stone in 1948

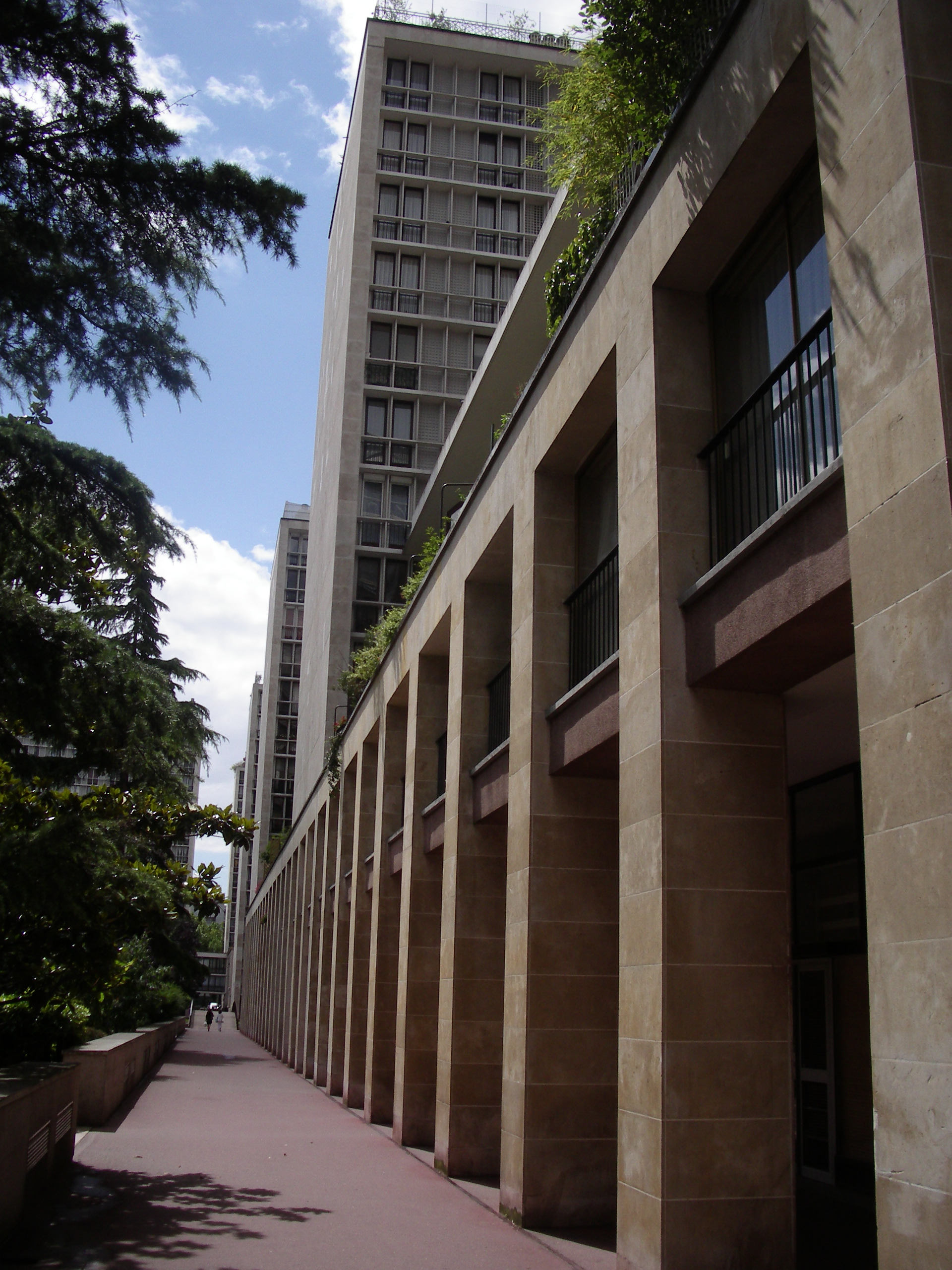
Part of a residential complex constructed using the massive precut stone method

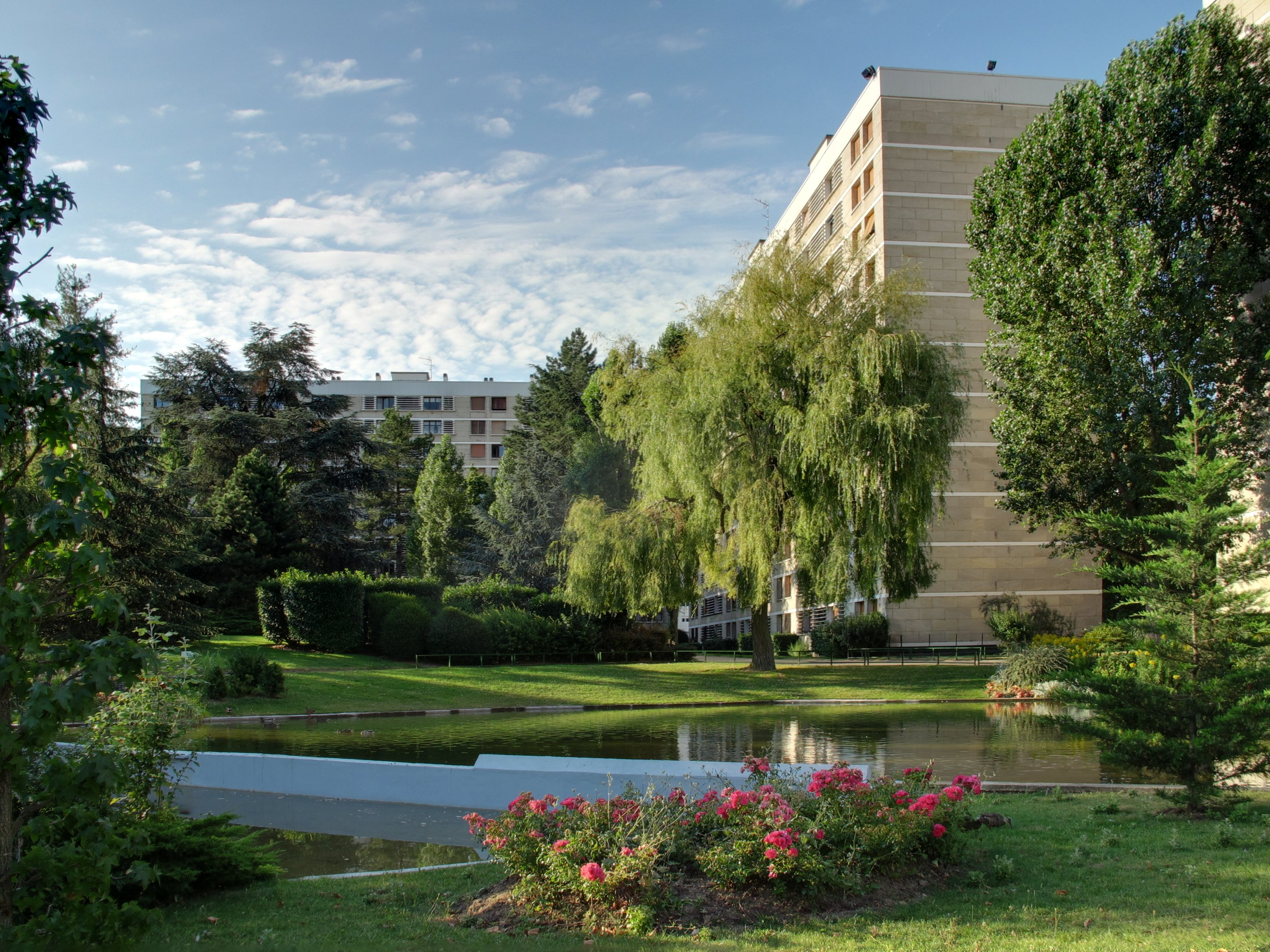
Apartment buildings built from massive-precut stone

Massive-precut stone is a modern stonemasonry method of building with load-bearing stone. Precut stone is a DFMA construction method that uses large machine-cut dimension stone blocks with precisely defined dimensions to rapidly assemble buildings in which stone is used as a major or the sole load-bearing material.

A key technique of massive-precut stone ("MP stone") is to specify precut stone to precise dimensions that match the architect's plan for rapid construction, typically using a crane. The blocks may be numbered so that the masons can follow the plan procedurally. The use of massive stone blocks has several benefits, listed below.

Massive-precut stone construction was originally developed by Fernand Pouillon in postwar period who referred to the method as "pierre de taille" or "pré-taille" stone. It became possible through innovations by Pouillon and Paul Marcerou, a masonry engineer at a quarry in Fontvieille, to adapt high-precision saws from the timber industry to quarrying and stone sawing.

Massive-precut stone is also known as "prefabricated stone", "pre-sized stone", "megalithic" construction, "massive stone", or simply "mass stone". However, these terms have various namespace conflicts with other stonemasonry techniques like synthetic stone, cosmetic (non-loadbearing) precut stone, or older methods of massive handworked stonemasonry. MP stone has a close affiliation with tensioned stone as compatible methods of modern load-bearing stonemasonry. Similarly, massive-precut stone (aka mass stone) has a connection to mass timber as allied low-carbon construction methods using traditional structural materials in a new context.

Since 1948, MP stone buildings have been constructed in France, Algeria, Iran, Switzerland, Palestine, the United Kingdom, Spain, and India. The re-adoption of MP stone inspired architecture critic Rowan Moore to speculate that "It's conceivable, indeed, that the era of concrete will prove only an interlude in the far longer history of stone."

== Design features ==
MP stone is defined by five design attributes. These differentiate MP stone from both traditional stonemasonry and modern non-load-bearing or non-DFMA stone methods.

- Load bearing. This distinguishes MP stone from cosmetic precut stone, which is used for cladding decoration.
- Massive blocks. Using massive dimensions has three critical benefits: (1) minimizing cuts, which lowers cost and shortens production time, (2) increases the thermal mass of walls for temperature regulation in the building, and (3) makes use of crane construction, thereby lowering manual labor, shortening assembly time, reducing mortar, labor, and cost.
- Precise offsite dimension cuts. Precutting can be done at the quarry, or at a masonry workshop by sawyer and banker masons. The precision amounts to a form of prefabrication, such that the masons do not have to make adjustments onsite, and construction is an assembly process. Precise interfaces also reduce the amount of mortar required.
- Machine fabrication and assembly. Unlike traditional stonemasonry, cutting (saws) and assembly (cranes) is primarily done with machines.
- Design for manufacturing and assembly. The architect will design the building to specify each ashlar's dimensions. Blocks are to be designed to be as modular as possible, ideally with a handful of different shapes. Reducing the types of shape simplifies manufacture. Pouillon was able to build large housing projects faster and cheaper than the competition, in part due to his DFMA process.
  "Exactly how Pouillon brought the 2,635 apartments of the 1959 Résidence du Parc in Meudon-la-Forêt (1959) online in record time and at less-than-market prices remains a mystery no-one seems to want to see solved." – Graham McKay.

== Types of construction ==
There are three implementations of massive-precut stone.

- Massive-precut monolithic ashlars. Blocks cut precisely on four to six sides, used to assemble walls, lintels over windows and doors, and in flat arches. The first major use of this variation was in the La Tourette and Vieux-Port redevelopment projects.
- End-shaped massive-precut monoliths. Quarry-finished dimension stone blocks with precisely shaped ends for assembly into post-and-lintel frameworks. The first implementation of this method was in the 15 Clerkenwell Close building, completed 2017.
- Massive-precut cyclopean concrete blocks. Developed by IBAVI in Mallorca, rough stones are placed in a mold and saturated with concrete. The concrete is sawn into massive ashlars for crane assembly. Enables reuse of rough plum stones from traditional stone masonry. The first documented architectural use of precut cyclopean concrete blocks was in a social housing project on Mallorca in the early 2020s.
- Tensioned stone. Stone beams and columns can be strengthened by drilling a duct that is threaded with a tension cable. After assembly with grout, the cables are tensioned using standard pre-stressing jacks. Both pre- and post tensioned stone can be used.

MP stone is typically used in conjunction with other materials, notably for floors, as unreinforced stone is unsuitable for tensile spans. It has most often been used together with reinforced concrete floors, but plans are in place to use it with cross-laminated timber floors, and post-tensioned stone floors. Reinforcing massive precut stone with post-tensioning reinforcement would make it strong enough to substitute for reinforced concrete in a wide range of applications.

In 2024, UK industry group the Stone Collective was formed to promote construction with stone, and advance education in this area.

== Benefits ==
MP stone construction has five key advantages over non-massive stone and brick masonry, concrete, wood, and other conventional construction methods.

=== Specific benefits ===
- Build speed. The use of precisely cut and numbered ashlars, combined with crane-assisted assembly, significantly reduces construction time compared to traditional stone masonry techniques. Compared to concrete construction, MP stone is faster as there is only a limited setting wait time.
- Simplicity. Amin Taha compares a stone-clad concrete column with a stone column. The former demands multiple layers: steel, concrete, fireproofing, waterproofing, stone cladding, and the fixtures connecting them; all require the various specialized workers for installation. The latter is a block of stone that is installed by masons using a crane and mortar.
- Design efficiency. Simplicity improves design efficiency, enabling architects to generate and iterate building designs quickly. Use of DFMA and modularity improves the chance of project success.
- Labor efficiency. The use of cranes and a well-organized construction plan reduces the labor required, lowering costs and reducing the wait time for skilled mason availability.
- Cost reduction. Compared to brick masonry or smaller ashlars, using larger stone blocks (and thereby minimizing sawing and fixer-masonry costs), means that the overall expense of constructing a building can be reduced.

=== General advantages ===
- Environmental benefits. The use of a material with lower embedded carbon contributes to a more sustainable building process, minimizing the environmental impact. Lower carbon emissions: load-bearing stone construction emits around 1/10th the carbon as a comparable concrete building. As 80% of energy is non-grid fossil fuel, and construction is respoinsible for 8% of carbon emissions, the replacement of coal-burning concrete production with lower-energy dimension-stone production could have a substantial impact on net-zero goals.
  "Imagine: we currently crush, burn and chemically mix limestone to make cement for concrete that then has 40 per cent of the strength of its original strength, needing steel to reinforce it. Why do we use concrete then?"
- Durability. Buildings constructed using massive precut stone maintain the inherent durability and longevity of stone construction, offering long-lasting and low-maintenance structures. Historically, load-bearing stone is the most durable construction method. An engineering analysis of a 20-storey unreinforced MP-stone tower has suggested this method has good seismic resilience:
  "With regard to the current Algerian seismic design regulation, the results obtained in terms of time period, frequency, storey drifts and displacements showed that the ... [Diar Es Saada massive precut stone] ... tower can be considered as an earthquake-resistant building fulfilling the required structural safety conditions."
- Aesthetics. Compared to concrete and other materials, massive precut stone construction yields visually striking and distinctive buildings that showcase the natural beauty of stone. There is a trend away from artificial stone products due to their fake image. "People increasingly want the authentic beauty and inconsistencies of natural stone; imitation ceramic tiles include realistic veins but have a repeat pattern like wallpapers, so you can tell quickly that they're fake."
- Reusability. When a building has reached the end of its usefulness, rectilinear ashlars are easily reused as spolia in new construction.
- Thermal performance. As with traditional stone construction, massive precut stone buildings benefit from excellent thermal mass, helping regulate indoor temperatures and reduce energy consumption for heating and cooling.
- Fire resistance. Compared to wood and other products, stone has far superior fire resistance, so requires little or no additional fireproofing.

== Controversies ==
MP stone has been ignored or resisted by mainstream architects, engineers, and developers, for reasons including the following.

- Belief that dimension stone is too expensive for non-luxury load-bearing construction. Depending on the context, this may be true if quarries are not developed for large precision blocks. However, in the early 2020s, quarries in France and Italy were able to furnish cost-effective precision-cut stone. Amin Taha of Groupwork points out that using stone directly obviates the use of fireproofing, waterproofing, stone (or other) cladding, associated fixtures, and cuts labor costs, while simplifying design and design iterations.
- Claim that MP stone cannot be safely used for tall structures. This view is contradicted by two 70-yo towers standing >50 m, located at 2 Rue Saint Laurent, Marseille; and Diar Es Saada, Algiers, the latter of which is close to a fault. Also the stone towers of cathedrals that have lasted for centuries, and ancient tall stone structures—like the 48-m Pont du Gard—that have stood for millennia.
- Unsuitability of MP stone for long spans, including floors. Due to its poor tensile strength, stone cannot be used for long spans, so (unlike reinforced concrete), architects and builders must switch modes during design and construction of horizontal and vertical components. MP stone can be used in conjunction with concrete floors, manufactured timber panels, and post-tensioned stone flooring units.
- The mainstream modernists, who were focused on concrete, steel, and other new materials, disliked the continuity with the old world that MP stone represented. This disregard for stone in fact violated Louis Sullivan's maxim that "form follows function".
- Following the construction of 15 Clerkenwell Close, the quarry finishes on the blocks was opposed by a local councilmember due to claims about heritage style and aesthetics. Ironically the use of load-bearing rusticated stone is an ancient style and the use of limestone was specifically appropriate to the site, which was the site of a limestone Norman abbey.
- In many nations, quarries produce aggregate, or dimension stone is only produced for cosmetic veneers, not structural purposes. This means that the most abundant natural construction resource is inaccessible to most of the world's population. This explains why the method has been used most extensively in France, where the quarrymasters and other stonemasons are knowledgeable in load-bearing stone. The presence of heritage stonemasons in many regions suggests that there is the potential to restore structural stonemasonry in many countries.
- There is the perception that stone quarries are destructive to the environment. This position ignores the fact that concrete and steel each require multiple quarries and mines, along with intensive carbon release due to extraction and heating.

== History ==
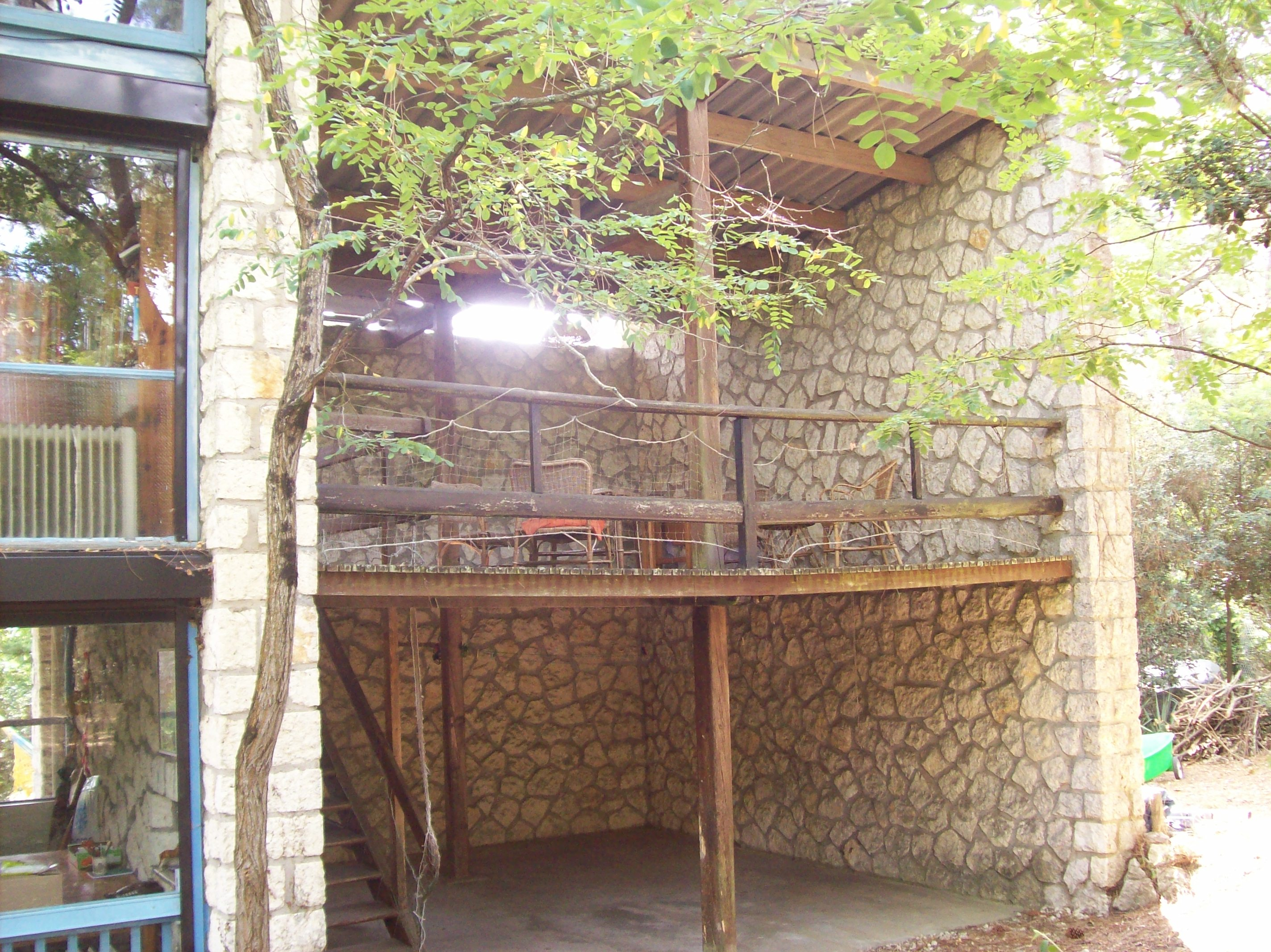
Load-bearing stone walls of Corbusier's Villa le Sextant

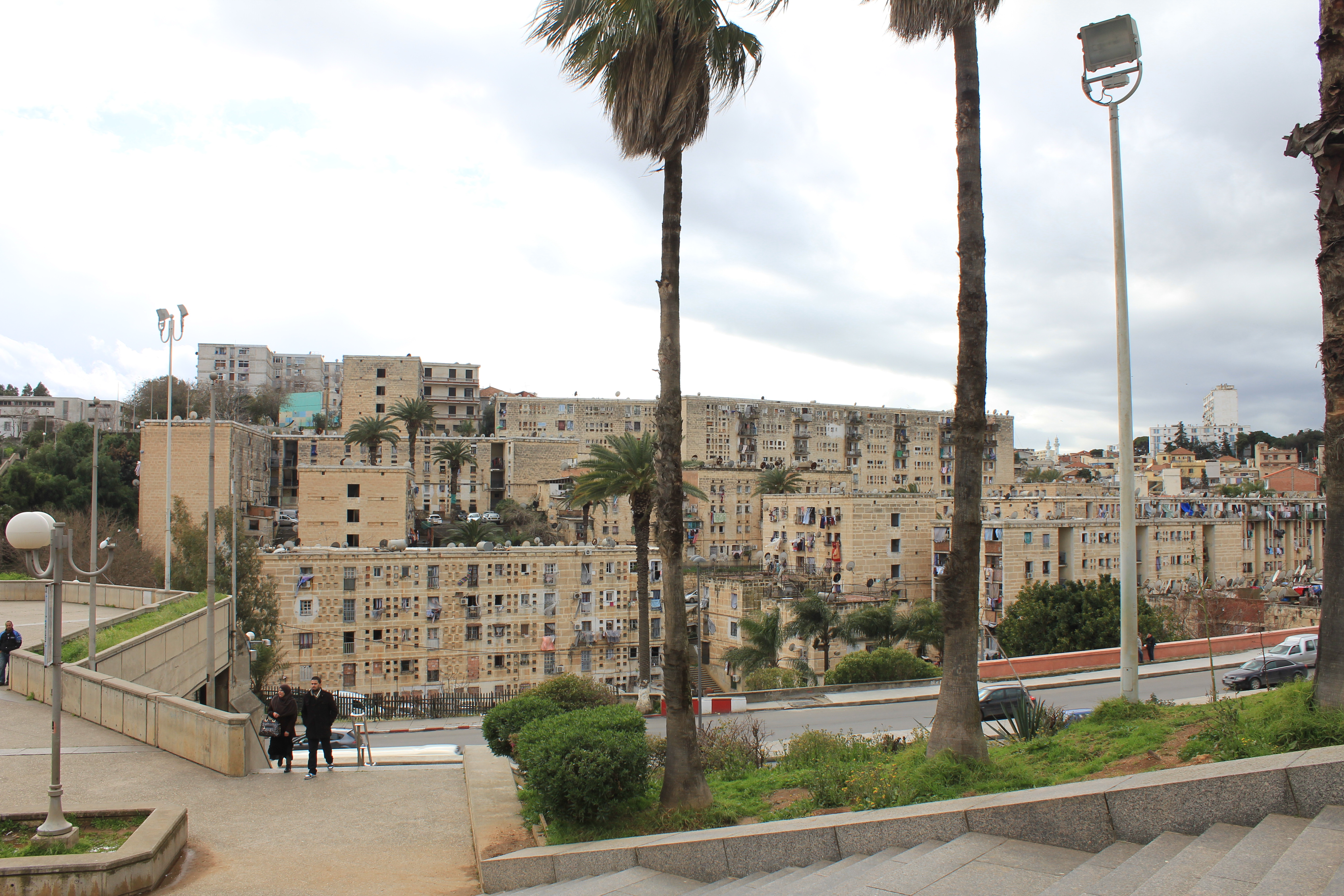
Massive-precut stone apartment complex Diar el Mahçoul in El Madania, Algeria

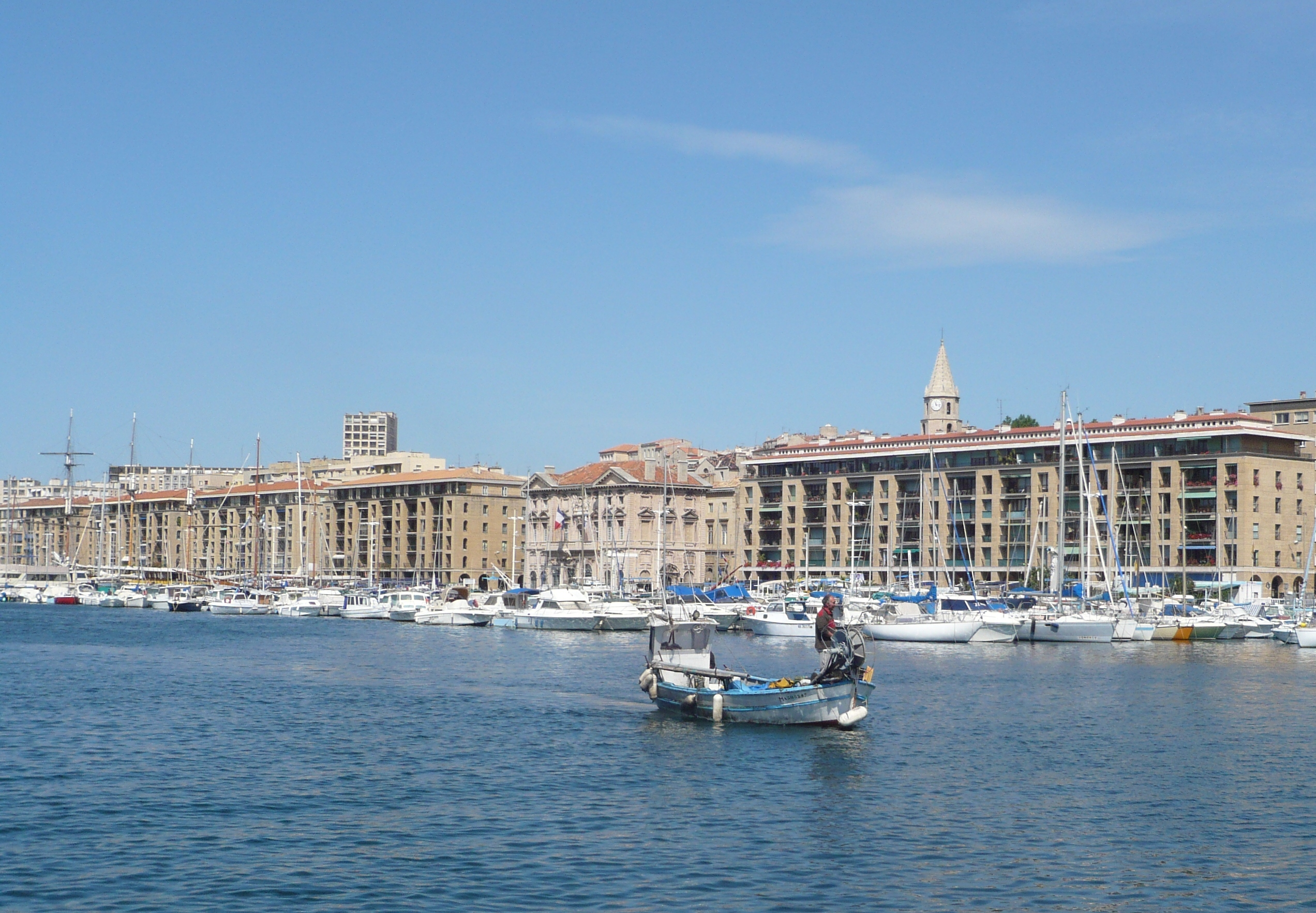
Massive-precut stone buildings on Marseille's Vieux-Port waterfront

The history of construction with stone goes back thousands of years, to before the age of the pyramids, but these constructions used muscle energy to cut stones, typically with considerable fixer stonemasonry on site. In modern architecture, stone had been used in a number of contexts, even prior to the development of the massive-precut method.

In the 19th century, architect Louis Sullivan used load-bearing stone walls in the Auditorium Building (1889) in Chicago. In the 20th century, most modern architects pivoted to steel and concrete construction. Nevertheless, even modernists used load-bearing stone in some projects, e.g. Le Corbusier included stone walls in Villa de Mandrot (1931), Maison Henfel (1934), and Villa Le Sextant (1935). Some of the Prairie School architects, including Frank Lloyd Wright, used stone in houses. Wright houses that use stone include Fallingwater (1935), the Mrs. Clinton Walker House, and his own houses Taliesin (1925) and Taliesin West (1937). Another Prairie-School architect, Walter Burley Griffin, used stone in the Joshua Melson house (1912) and site-quarried, load-bearing sandstone in his Castlecrag suburban development (from 1922), a technique that aimed to enable the mass production of housing from the local Sydney bedrock.

After these efforts to include stone into modern construction, the large-scale use of massive precut stone was pioneered by Fernand Pouillon (1912-1986), a French architect who was active in post-war reconstruction. Starting in the 1940s, his innovative approach to stone led to the development of numerous noteworthy projects, with a particular focus on apartment complexes. Throughout his long career, Pouillon played a crucial role in the development and popularization of massive precut stone construction techniques. His pioneering work laid the foundation for subsequent architects to build upon and innovate, leading to the resurgence and expansion of this construction method in modern architecture.

=== MP stone in the 20th century: Pouillon ===
Fernand Pouillon, French Wikipedia

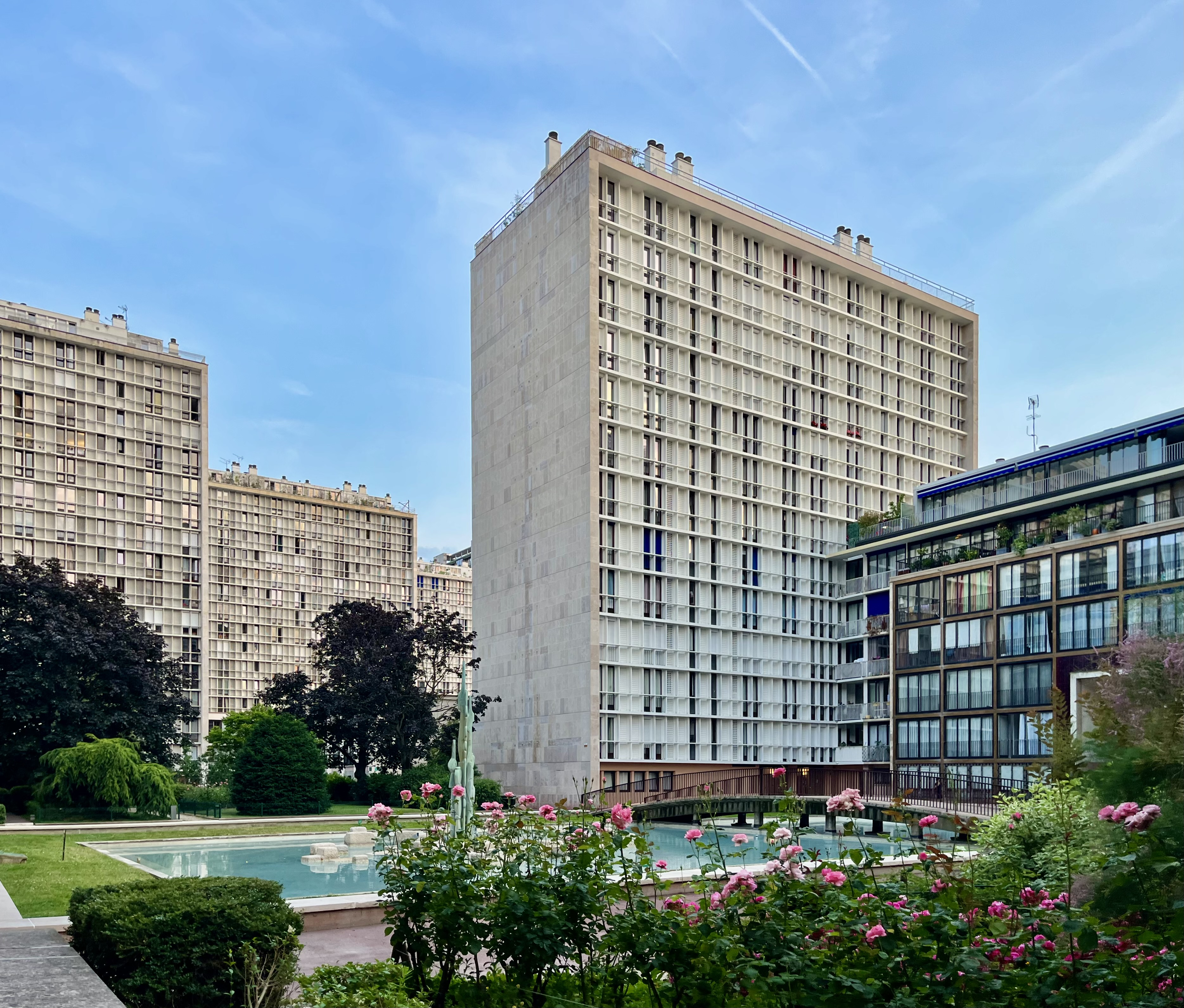
A view of Pouillon's Résidence Le-Point-du-Jour (1963) in Boulogne-Billancourt, France

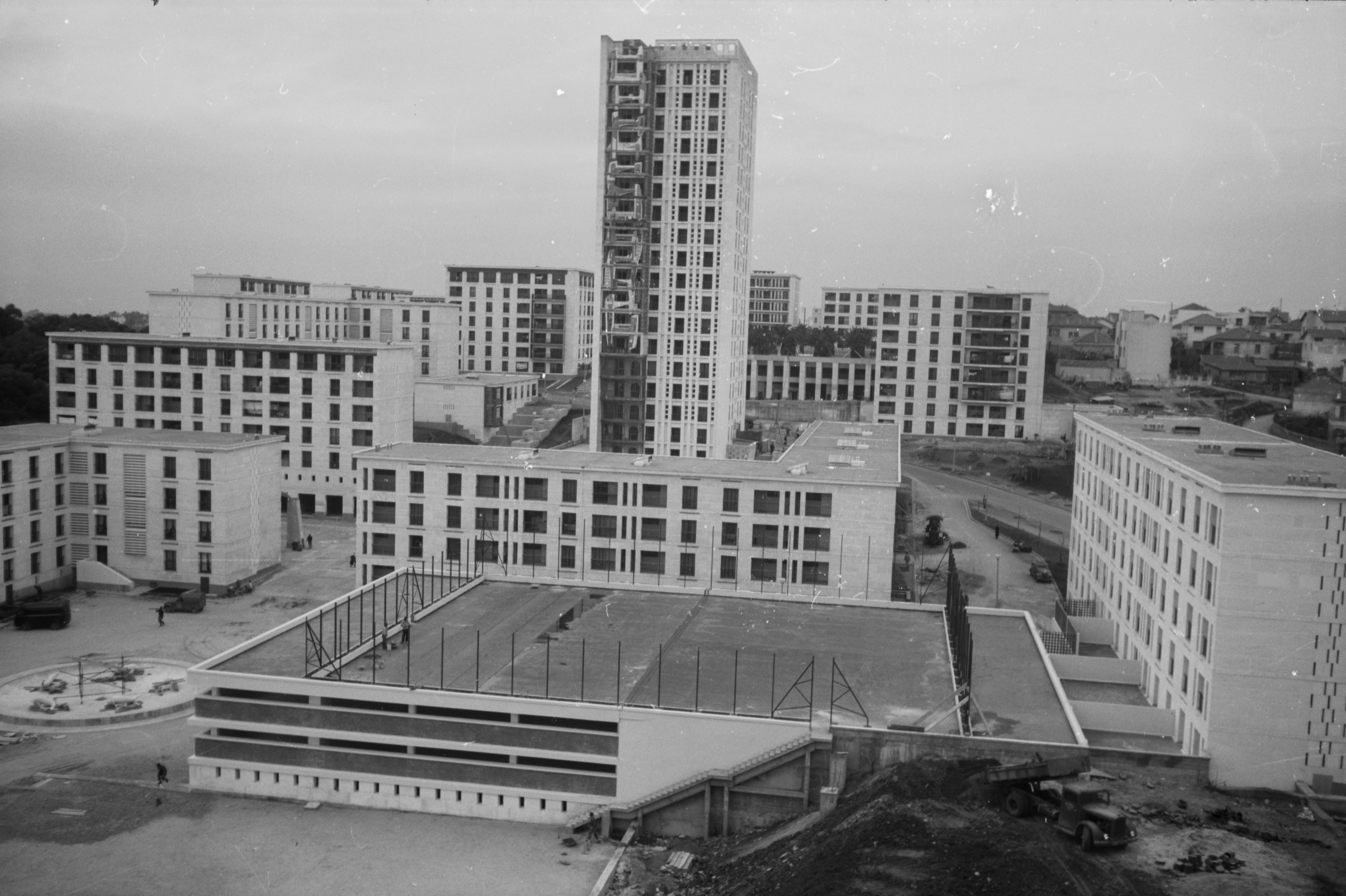
Diar es Saâda, including the 20-storey stone tower

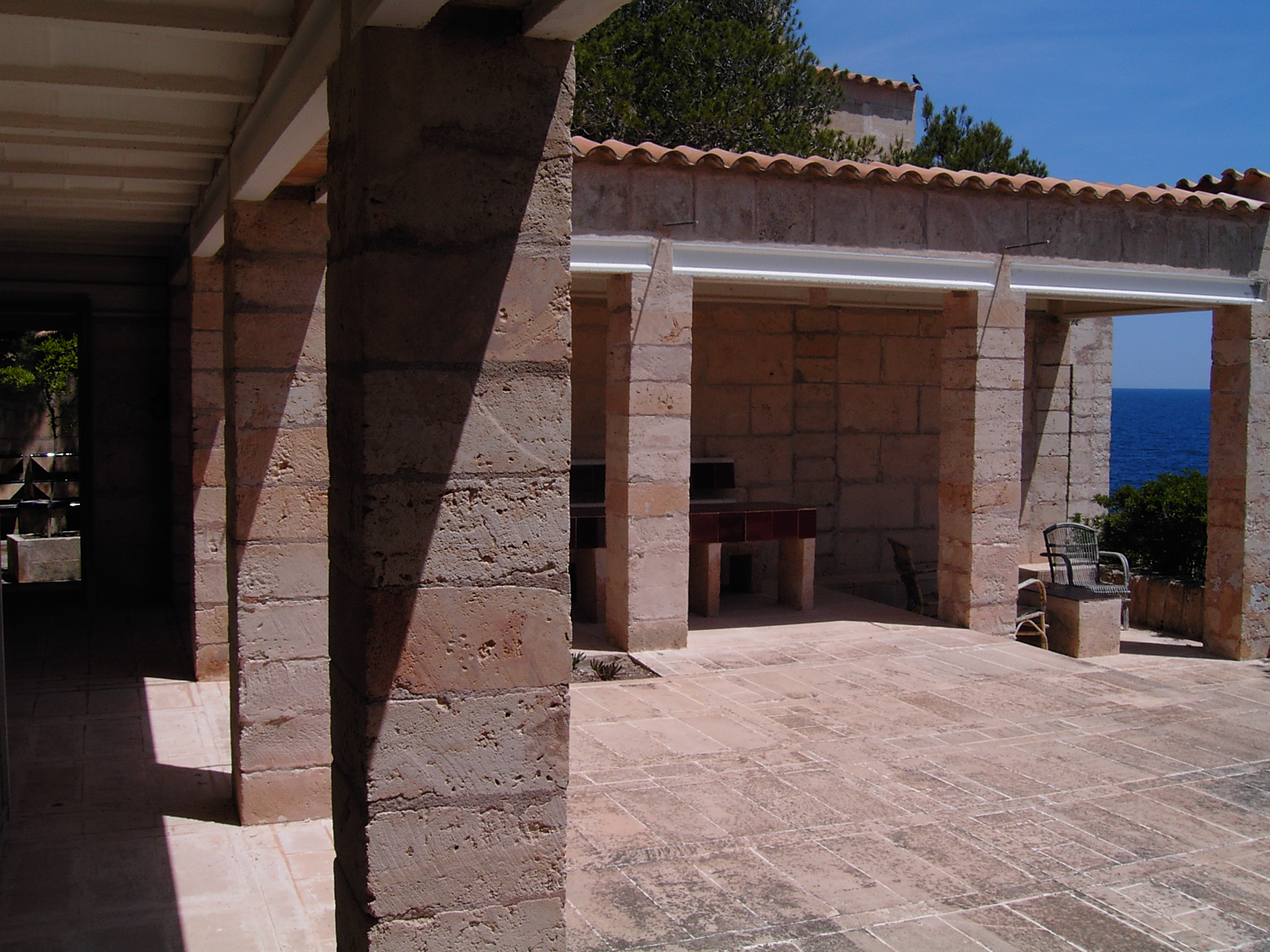
Jørn Utzon's Can Lis

In the post-war era, Pouillon—first in Auguste Perret's firm and then through his own office—designed and completed MP-stone buildings that held tens of thousands of apartments, in France and Algeria. In post-war France, there was a huge demand for new urban housing, but cement and steel were relatively expensive; machine-cut limestone represented a plentiful, economical building material.

- Mid-century precut stone. Precut stone for modern architecture was pioneered by Fernand Pouillon in the post-war period in France, Algeria, and Iran. The method was made possible by a collaboration with Paul Marcerou, a masonry engineer at a quarry in Fontvieille.

"This new technique consisted of adapting machines used to form steel and wood to cut stone. As a result of this technique it became possible to mine and shape the blocks of the Fontvielle quarry very finely, which allowed for a particular building technique, named 'ready-made' or 'prefabricated' stone by Pouillon."

- 1940s: Pouillon began experimenting with the use of machines to cut stone, adapting technologies initially designed for steel and wood processing. This new technique enabled the precise shaping of stone blocks from the Fontvielle quarry. The signature development from this time was the design and construction of La Tourette in the reconstruction of the Vieux-Port of Marseille, in collaboration with André Devin, Eugène Beaudoin, and Auguste Perret. A landmark development in this project was the construction of the first MP stone skyscraper, 2 Rue Saint-Laurent, a 16-storey apartment building.
- 1950s: Pouillon designed and constructed various housing projects in France using his prefabricated stone technique, such as the Meissonier housing project in Aix-en-Provence, which showcased the speed and efficiency of his construction method. He worked in Paris, building several large housing developments of architectural merit.
- Algeria, 1950s-1970s: Pouillon was invited by the colonial government to bring his work to Algeria, to address their housing crisis. He designed several major housing projects in Algiers, such as Diar es-Saâda (730 units), Diar el Mahçoul (900 units) and Climat de France (3500 units), that latter of which was "the backdrop of the concluding scenes of the 1966 film The Battle of Algiers". Although these projects utilized French stone, they demonstrated the adaptability of his technique to a different region. One notable building of this era was the Tower of Diar es-Saâda, a 20-storey unreinforced MP stone skyscraper, which has stood undamaged for 70 years in a seismically active region.
- Can Lis, 1973. The modernist architect Jørn Utzon built his house Can Lis on Mallorca from local marés sandstone. The use of quarry-precut stone in standardized, large ashlars for a modern design is considered a masterpiece, and can be said to be a major work built in MP stone. Both Utzon and Burley Griffin, two architects who won competitions for major Australian projects, built seaside sandstone houses after being removed from their competition projects.

=== Gilles Perraudin's revival of MP stone ===
- Throughout the 70s, 80s and much of the 90s, mass stone was largely forgotten. In these post-Pouillon years, there were no practicing architects constructing modernist stone buildings, with the notable exception of Utzon's second stone house Can Feliz, completed in 1994. The legacy of architects like Le Corbusier and the other mainstream modernists left the focus on reinforced concrete. In the modern context, stone became associated with heritage buildings and decorative cladding of concrete.
- The Vauvert Winery, 1998. Lyon-based French architect Gilles Perraudin embraced Pouillon's technique, starting with the construction of the Vauvert Winery. The winery used stone from a quarry close to Pont du Gard. A difference from Pouillon was the use of MP stone in a dry-stone (mortar-free) "trilithic," trabeated system. Eventually this building, Perraudin's other MP stone projects, and the architect's hands-on course in stone architecture would inspire renewed interest in massive precut stone construction, with a particular focus on social housing.

=== MP stone in the 2010s: renaissance ===
- Apartments in Cornebarrieu, 2011. Completion of a sustainable MP stone building with 20 social-housing units in Cornebarrieu, France, designed by Perraudin. The first MP stone housing project since Pouillon was active, and led to additional phases, resulting in 104 units total.

"The project followed several key principles: North-south oriented housing for proper ventilation during summer; Use of 40 cm thick structural massive stone for better high thermal inertia and summer comfort; Unprocessed and unpainted materials: solid wood window frames and shutters left untreated to age naturally; walls without plaster. Constructed with a social housing budget of €1,150/sqm (m^{2}), this project demonstrated the modernity of stone construction, perfectly suited to today's housing demands. Massive stone allows for quick, relatively dry construction with minimal site disturbance and reduced assembly time. The stone's properties of thermal inertia, phase shift, and hygrothermal regulation make it a healthy and durable material. Recycling is limited to deconstruction and reuse of stones in their original form."

- 2013. House in Croix Rousse, Lyon, France. Perraudin Architects.
- In Palestine in 2015, AAU Anastas architects complete the Toulkarem Courthouse, which uses MP stone with concrete.
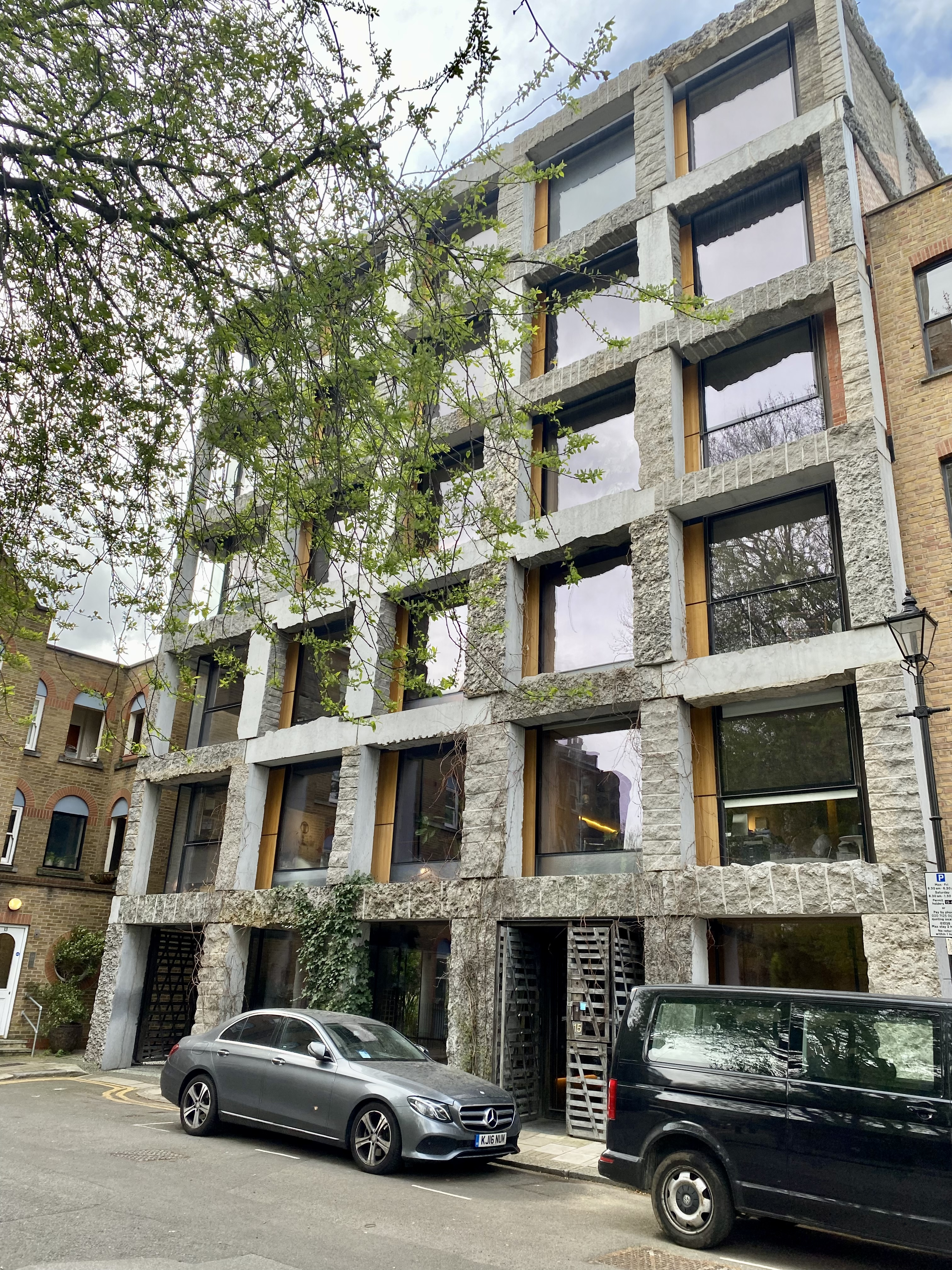
  The stone building at 15 Clerkenwell Close in Clerkenwell
- Mixed-used building, London. In 2017, Groupwork completed 15 Clerkenwell Close, an innovative building that used massive precut stone in a post-and-lintel exoskeleton design. Unlike the Vauvert winery's triliths, the partially dimensioned blocks were left with quarry finishes except for critical contact points. The quarry-hewn approach yields a saving in dimension sawing, while facilitating precise, modular assembly with minimal or no modification during construction. The use of end-precut blocks is the first major innovation since Pouillon, as it further reduces the cost of dimension cuts, while retaining DFMA approach and modularity. The three quarry finishes (sawn, drilled, and ripped) caused controversy in the neighbourhood for years, but conversely was given city and national awards by RIBA in 2018, and shortlisted for the Stirling Prize in 2021. The building cost was £2,325 per sqm, with a contract value of £4.65m.
- Social housing, Paris, 2017. In Paris's 11th district, 92 Rue Oberkampf was designed by Barrault Pressacco architects in a contemporary interpretation of Hausmannian style. Completed in 2017, the development was built using abundant limestone from the Paris Basin; 92 Rue Oberkampf demonstrated the feasibility of infill urban housing development with stone, and helped pave the way for the numerous French MP stone housing projects in the subsequent years. The building cost €3.2m for 1280 sqm, €2500 per sqm.
- Plainfaing Tourist Office, France; completed in 2019, designed by Studiolada, made from pink sandstone.
- In the 2010s, the housing institute of the Balearic Islands (IBAVI) started a programme to build >1000 apartments from mostly local materials. Inspired by Jørn Utzon's Can Lis and Can Feliz, they implemented a program of using precut local marés sandstone for construction. As of 2022, they had built hundreds of apartments from MP stone, and pioneered a number of novel techniques, including the implementation of stone barrel vaults for social housing, use of a fast-setting cement mixture that allows laying several courses per day, and cyclopean concrete blocks. Projects include the Salvador Espriu social-housing development in Palma de Mallorca.
- In 2018 and 2019, Barrault Pressacco, an architecture firm organized an exhibition at Pavillon de l'Arsenal and published a booklet, both titled "Pierre: Révéler la ressource, explorer le matériau" (Stone: Revealing the Resource, Exploring the Material), in which they describe the process of quarrying limestone, particularly in the Paris region, and describe the various mass-stone social-housing projects completed or ongoing in France at that time.

=== MP stone in the 2020s: wider adoption ===
The most recent MP stone housing typically uses a combination of materials, usually concrete plinths and internal structure, with load-bearing stone facades. Following the work by Perraudin and Barrault Presacco, a range of French architects adopted this method and applied it to projects across France.

- 2020-2021. The French government announced plans for a sustainability law mandating that new public buildings must be constructed with at least 50% timber or other natural materials. This was part of overall policy to reduce embodied carbon in new construction, a regulation that favors building with low-carbon materials like stone.
- 2020. Designed by architect Jean-Christophe Quinton, a building at 12 Rue Jean-Bart in Paris's 6th district was completed. The project features eight social housing units and an extension of a nursery. With its vertical openings and limestone facade, the building subtly blends into the typical Parisian street while maintaining a contemporary presence.
- 2020. A group of building experts published the Stone Tower Research Project, showing that construction of a 30-storey skyscraper office block with a combination of an MP-stone load-bearing exoskeleton and post-tensioned stone flooring panels would cost less than the same building in concrete. In conjunction with cross-laminated timber, the stone skyscraper would be carbon negative.
- 2020. Massive-precut stone was featured prominently in "The New Stone Age", an exhibition at The Building Centre.
- 2020. Architect Raphaël Gabrion designed a sustainable building at 52 Rue des Cévennes in Paris's 15th district, comprising 9 social housing units. The design employs load-bearing massive stone on the building's periphery and an interior structure of concrete columns and slabs. The massive stone offers the advantage of total, non-destructive disassembly.
- 2021. In Plan-les-Ouates, Switzerland, 68 apartments completed. Designed by the Perraudin Archiplein Consortium, planning started in 2016 for 8,000 m^{2} of floor space over eight floors in two towers, costing €24,000,000 excl. VAT (€3,000 per sqm).
- 2021. Architects Denis Eliet and Laurent Lehmann completed an apartment building in MP stone. Located near the Chantiers station in Versailles, the development has 16 units, a floor space of 5,000 m^{2} and primarily features cut stone as its main construction material.
- 2021. The 6th edition of the French 21st Natural Stone Construction Prize, titled "Construire en Pierre Naturelle au XXIe Siècle" (Building with Natural Stone in the 21st Century) awarded prizes exclusively to projects using load-bearing stone construction.
- 2021. The Rajkumari Ratnavati Girls School, Jaisalmer, India; designed by Diana Kellogg and built in local golden sandstone precut in Jaisalmer's stonemasonry district.
- 2021. Eight social housing units in Gignac-la-Nerthe, France, designed, by Atelier Régis Roudil Architectes.
- 2022. "L'Îlot fertile" was designed by TVK architects and completed in 2022 by Bouygues Construction subsidiary Linkcity. Located in the 19th district of Paris, the development has a floor space of 35,200 m^{2}; stone and concrete were used as the main construction materials.
- 2022. Perraudin and WYSWYG architects completed construction of their design of a mixed-used MP stone building in Lyon.
- In December 2023, France 2 covered the resurgence of stone construction.
- A 10-storey load-bearing stone building at 317 Finchley Road, London, designed by Groupwork with Webb Yates Engineers, was completed in 2026. Known as "Petra Heights", its structure uses approximately 725 tonnes of Norwegian stone across 596 columns and beams.

=== MP stone in planning and under construction ===
- In 2023, a covered market in Saint-Dizier, France, designed by Studiolada, was completed.
- For completion in 2023, Vincent Lavergne Architecture Urbanisme and Atelier WOA designed an apartment building 'Le Metropolitan' at 37 Rue de Lisbonne in Rosny-sous-Bois, France. This development consists of 270 housing units (including 43 social-housing units), 8 shops, and a parking facility. The building materials used for this project include cut stone from Carrières Violet in Nogent-sur-Oise, wood, and concrete. This project is one of dozens of load-bearing stone apartment buildings being built by the Verrecchia group.
- In 2021, Barrault Pressacco announced they had won a competition to build 58 apartments in Paris 13, with a design for a 50-m mass-stone building.
- In 2022, Groupwork won the competition for a housing project in Castle Park, Bristol, with a proposal that includes a low-carbon 30-storey tower from MP stone and wood. If completed, it would become the tallest massive-stone skyscraper, exceeding Pouillon's 20-storey 1953 tower in Diar es-Saâda, Algeria.
- In 2022, Eric Parry Architects submitted plans for a six-storey office block using loadbearing stone and CLT in north London.
- As of 2024, Groupe Pichet is preselling apartments in a stone building, Reflets de Pierres, planned for Ferney-Voltaire, designed by Perraudin.
- In 2026, a six-storey mixed-use stone and timber building by Groupwork received planning approval in Hackney, London.

== See also ==
- Fernand Pouillon
- Tensioned stone
- French Wikipedia on Pouillon
