= Tensioned stone =

Form of stonework used in construction

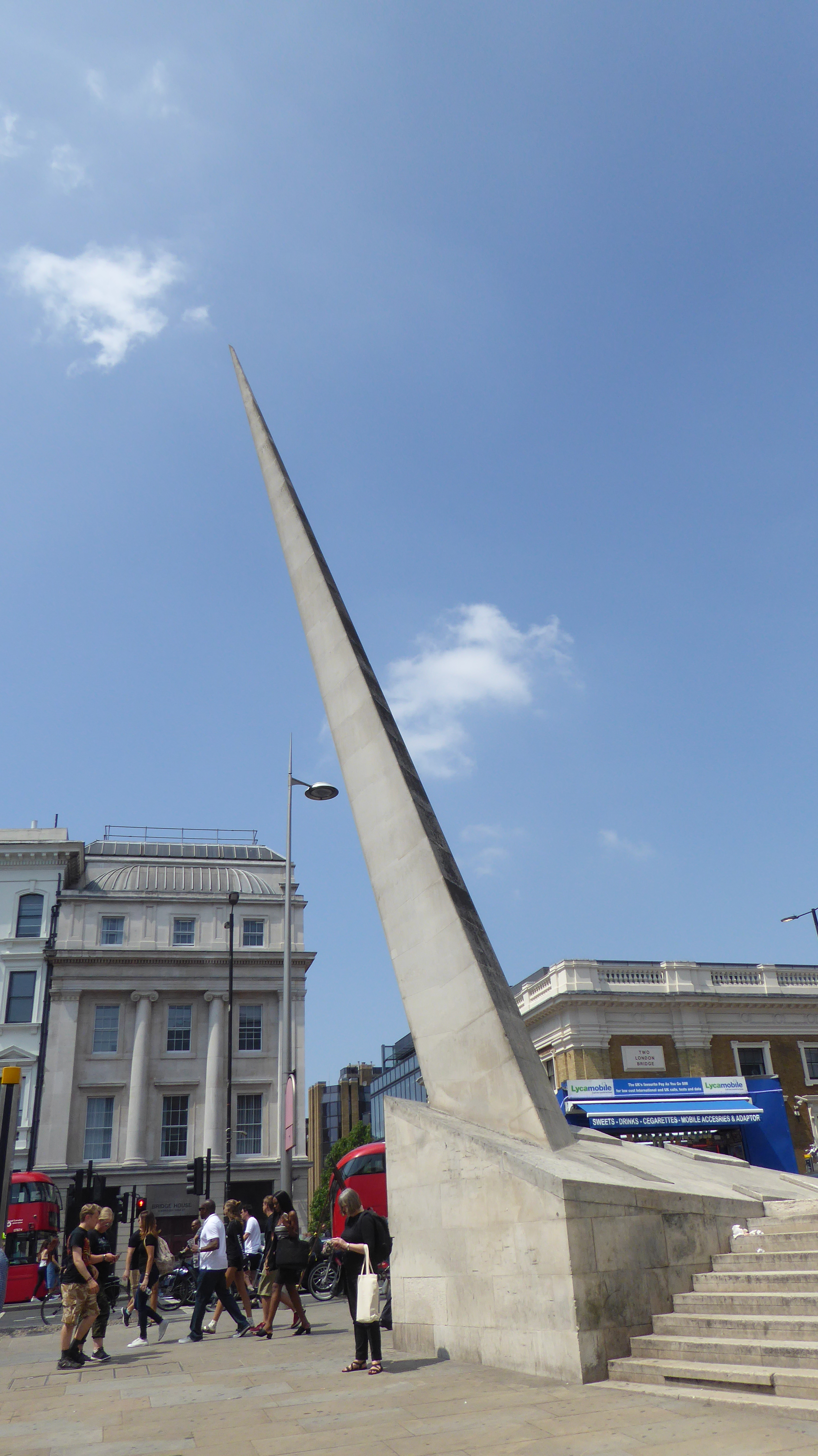
Southwark Gateway Needle, a post-tensioned stone structure

Tensioned stone is a high-performance composite construction material: stone held in compression with tension elements. The tension elements can be connected to the outside of the stone, but more typically tendons are threaded internally through a drilled duct.

Tensioned stone can consist of a single block of stone, though drill limitations and other considerations mean it is typically an assembly of multiple blocks with grout between pieces. Tensioned stone has been used in both vertical columns (posts), and in horizontal beams (lintels). It has also been used in more unusual stonemasonry applications: arch stabilization, foot bridges, granite flag posts, cantilevered sculptures, a space frame, and staircases.

Tensioned stone has an affiliation with massive precut stone, which is a central technique of modern load-bearing stonemasonry. It is also aligned with mass timber and straw structural insulated panels (SSIPs), which are all reconfigurations of traditional materials for modern construction that involve some pre-fabrication.

== Tensioned stone methods ==
Tensioning is achieved with steel tendons or rods that are either threaded through ducts within the stone elements or attached to the stone externally. For internal tensioning, holes are drilled into the stone elements to form a duct; the tensioning tendon is threaded into the duct.

The most common form of tensioned stone is post-tensioned stone, which also has the longest history. A second method, developed in the early 2020s, is pre-tensioned stone.

As with pre-stressed concrete, the pre- and post-tensioned methods can be used in different contexts: pre-tensioned stone may be more appropriate for prefabrication, while post-tensioning may be more suitable for on-site assembly.

=== Post-tensioned stone ===
For post-tensioning, once the stone components are in place, the tendons are tensioned using hydraulic jacks, and the force is transferred to the stone through anchorages located at the ends of the tendons, usually in combination with a plate. The tensioning process imparts a compressive force to the stone, which improves its capacity to resist tensile stresses that could otherwise cause cracking or failure.

=== Pre-tensioned stone ===
In pre-tensioned stone, the tendon (a steel rod) is held in tension with jacks while the remaining cavity in the duct is filled with epoxy grout. After the epoxy has set, the ends of the rod are released from the jacks, placing the stone under compression. A structural difference between pre- and post-tensioned stone is that, in the former, the tension element is adhered to the stone along its length, so compression is applied to the stone along the length of the duct, while in post-tensioned stone the pressure is applied through the end plates.

== Rationale ==
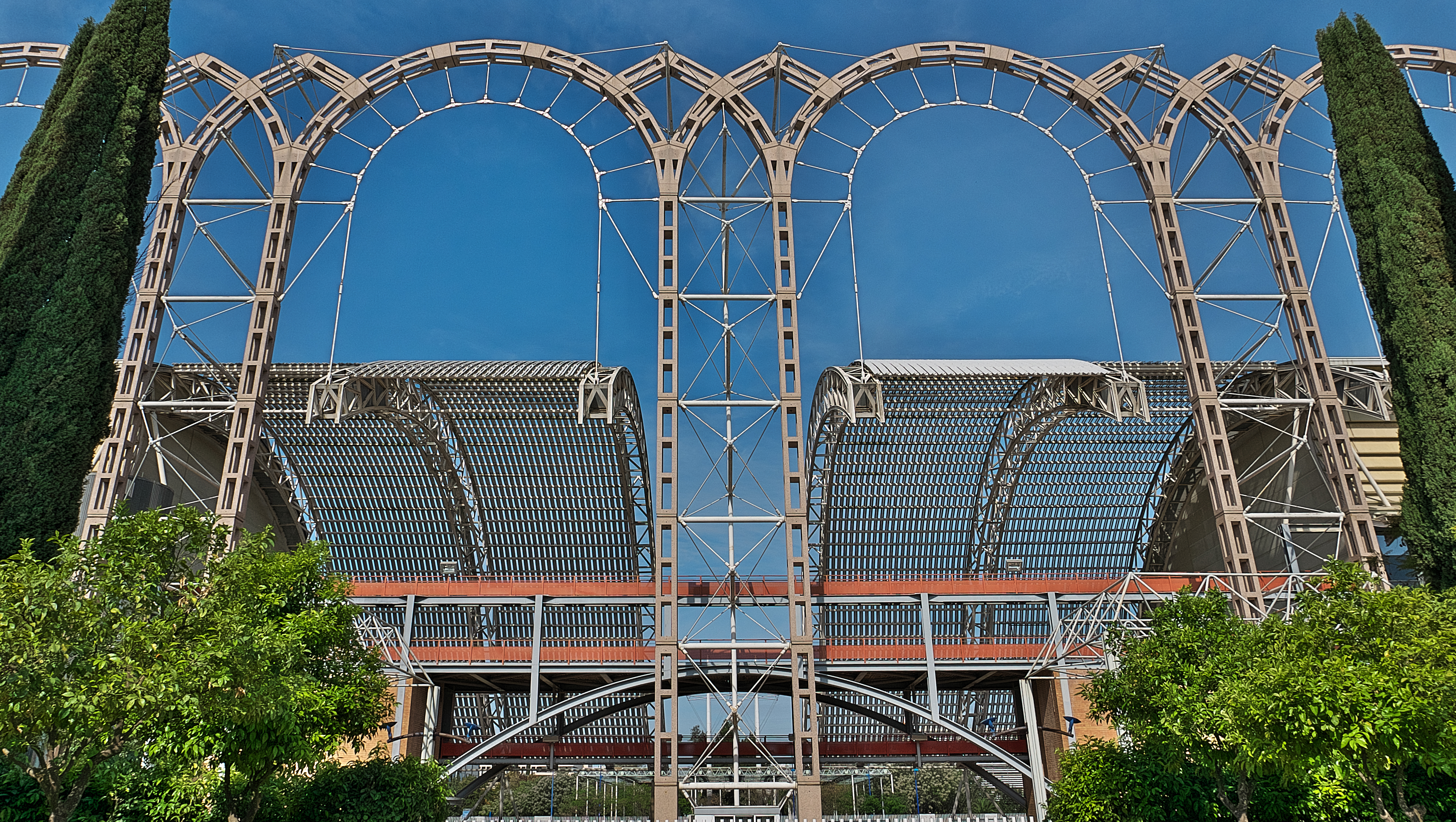
Pavilion of the Future, Seville Expo '92: post-tensioned stone arches support the pavilion roof.

=== Increased strength ===
Stone has great compressive strength, so is ideal in compressive structures like stone arches. However, it has relatively weak flexural strength (compared to steel or wood), so in isolation cannot be safely used in wide spans under tension.

"Post-tensioned stone increases the failure load of stone in bending, but also the stiffness of a structure by reducing joint cracking. This method of construction is widely used for concrete structures, but the advantages of using similar techniques with stone are only just being realised."

For concrete, this problem has been long solved: in addition to conventional tensile reinforcement, engineers developed prestressed concrete methods starting around 1888. Such tension-reinforced concrete applications combine compressive strength with pre-stressed tensile compression for combined strength much greater than either of the individual components, and have been in wide use for decades. One of the early concrete engineers Eugène Freyssinet improved concrete pre-stressing methods, and it is claimed that he also applied post-tensioned concrete methods to stone. As for concrete, post-tensioning maintains stone in compression, thereby increasing its strength.

=== Energy use and carbon emissions ===
Stone is 'natural precast concrete' so only needs to be cut (and strength tested) and tensioned prior to use in construction. Compared to concrete and steel, post-tensioned stone production has dramatically lower energy costs, with concomitant lower carbon emissions.

== Applications ==
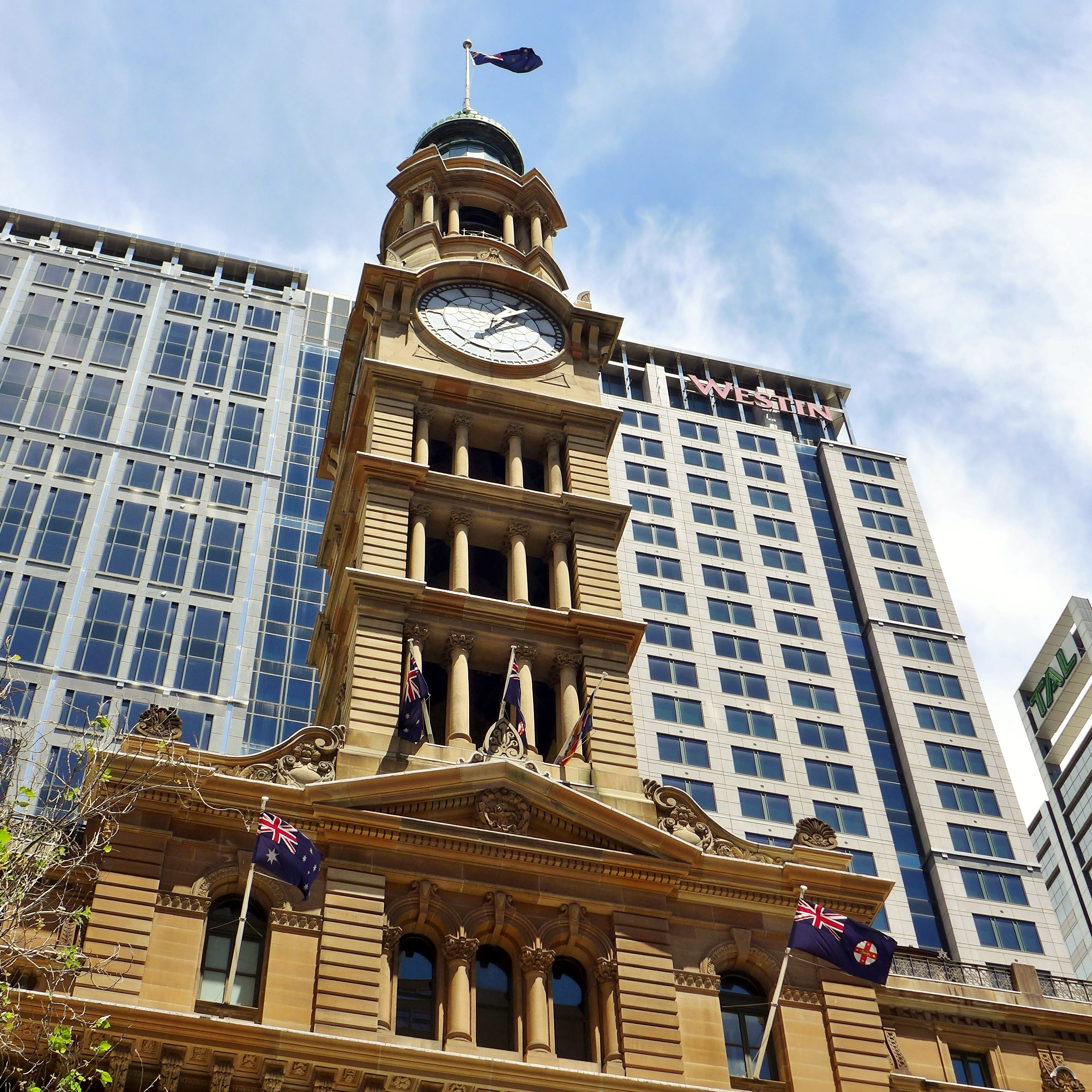
Sydney's General Post Office stone clock tower is reinforced with post-tensioning.

Post-tensioned stone has potential to replace steel-reinforced concrete in some contexts, as, according to structural engineer Steve Webb "a post-tensioned stone beam is as strong as steel". "Post-tensioning offers new potential for the revival of masonry as a structural material". Post-tensioned stone has the potential to be used in conjunction with massive precut stone in a range of designs.

In 2020, post-tensioned stone was featured prominently in "The New Stone Age", an exhibition at The Building Centre.

Architect James Simpson writes:

"The term 'engineered timber' is already commonly used in construction, so why not a structural 'engineered stone'? ... The most exciting possibility for the stone industry... is the possible creation of a system of engineered stone for framed, or partly framed, structures. This would exploit the compressive strength of stone, which can be greater than that of concrete, combined with post-tensioning by stainless steel rods. Walls, columns, beams and slabs could all be made from small pieces of factory-sawn stone, cut and pre-drilled to a design of standard components."

== Benefits ==
=== Structural benefits ===
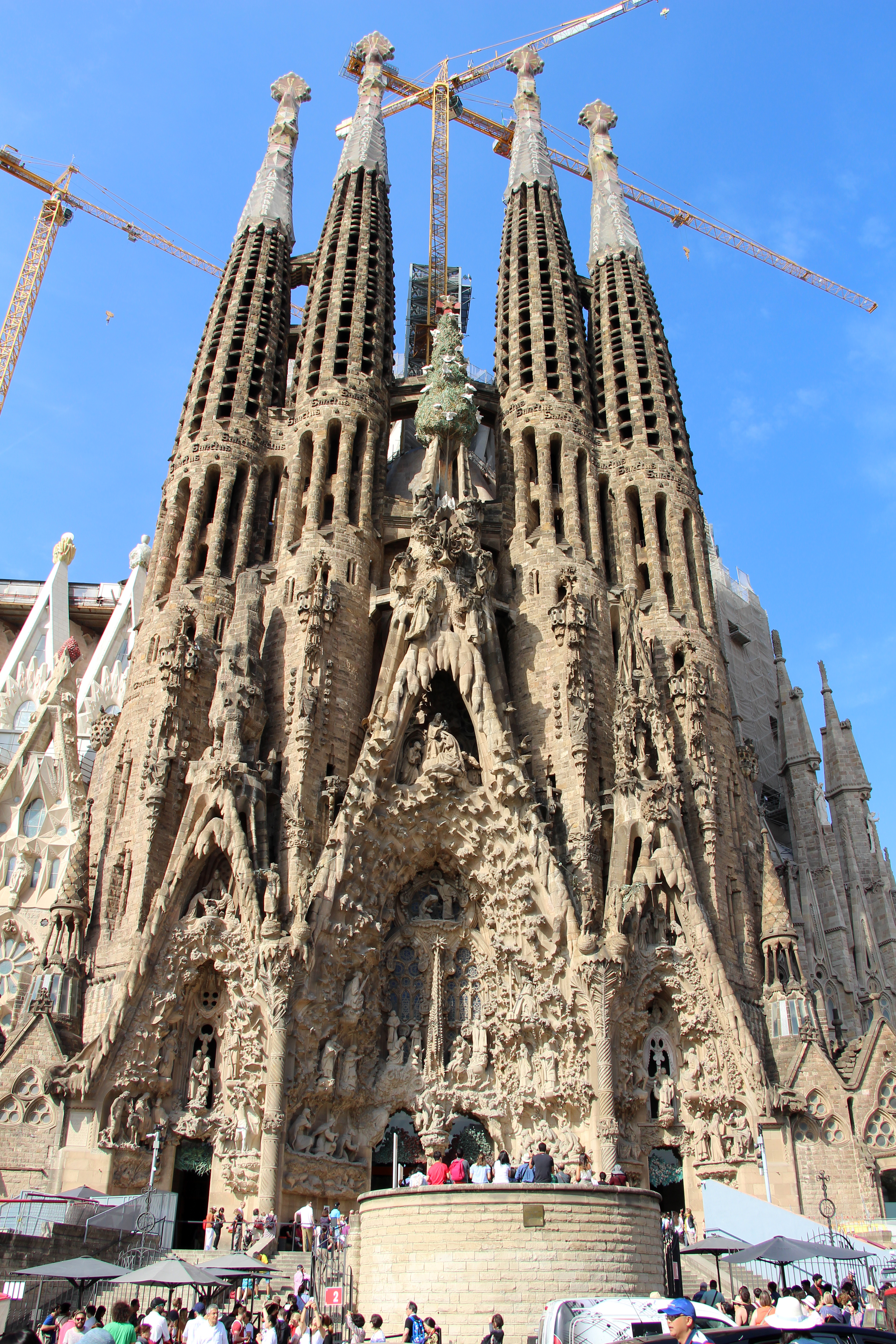
Construction of the Sagrada Família uses post-tensioned stone panels.

==== Advantages of tensioned stone relative to reinforced concrete ====
- Strength. Compared to standard concrete, many types of stone have increased compressive and tensile strength; this property contributes to the increased strength of the prestressed stone assembly (relative to concrete).
- Slenderness. Less bulky beams, due to stone's greater compressive strength compared to concrete.
- Durability offered by the stone's resistance to weather conditions. This reduces maintenance costs.
- Aesthetics. Instead of cladding concrete in stone, the load-bearing stone has the appearance of stone.
- Reduced embedded carbon. Post-tensioned stone causes the emission of <1/3rd of carbon dioxide greenhouse gas relative to concrete.
- Lower cost. A study of a 30-storey office block found that using PT stone floor panels was cheaper than concrete floors. Subsequent studies by Groupwork found that stone would be cheaper than concrete on most architectural projects (except for box girder bridges), but these studies were not published.

==== Advantages of tensioned stone relative to untensioned stone ====
- Reduced material usage. By enhancing the structural performance of stone, post-tensioning allows for the use of thinner stone slabs or walls, reducing the overall material requirements and associated costs.
- Expanded design options. Tensioning provides additional design options, allowing architects, engineers, and sculptors to create more innovative and complex structures that would be difficult to achieve with traditional stone construction methods.
- Seismic resilience. Compared to conventional stone, PT stone structures can have improved seismic performance, as the compressive forces could help to maintain the integrity of the structure during ground motion.

=== Operational advantages ===
Compared to conventional stonemasonry, post-tensioned stone has substantial structural and weight benefits. In addition, compared to standard stonemasonry, post-tensioned stone preassembly has at least three operational advantages

- Pre-assembly of the pieces can be done at ground level, reducing cost and improving safety.
- Easier review of the assembly, including testing strength and waterproofing of the mortar
- Easier to schedule tasks, as the prefabricated post-tensioned stone assemblies can be stored before using

== Challenges facing adoption ==
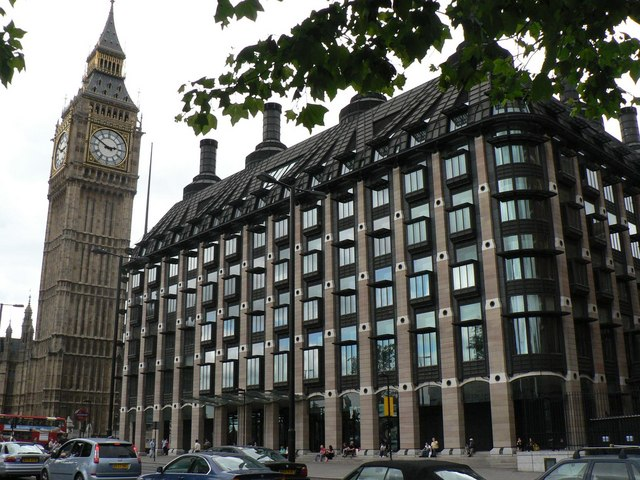
Portcullis House, Westminster, United Kingdom

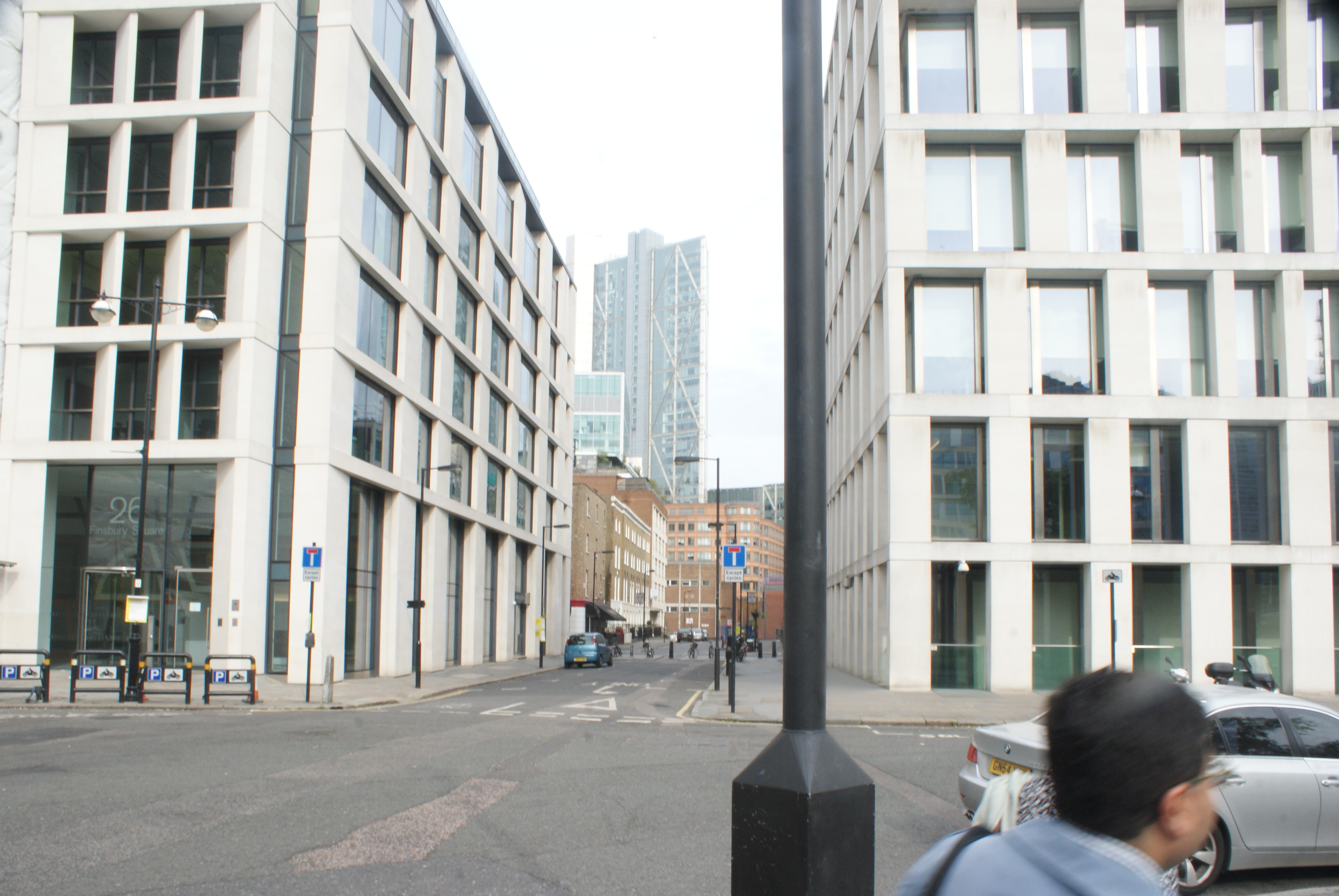
On the right: 30 Finsbury Square, a post-tensioned stone building in London.

The wide adoption of post-tensioned stone currently faces a number of challenges, including:

- Load-bearing stone's cultural affiliation with traditional architecture
- Confusion with the use of cosmetic stone in high-end luxury construction and the perception of high cost
- Limited knowledge amongst most structural engineers, beyond elite firms like Arup Group, Buro Happold, and Webb Yates. Structural engineering training does not include stone. This is changing with increased attention from the Institution of Structural Engineers.
- The absence of international standards for engineering with stone
- Lack of stonemasons with knowledge of tensioned stone methods. Lack of concrete workers with prestressing knowledge who also work with stone.
- Absence of a large-scale industry for pre-fabricated PT stone
- By analogy with precast concrete, a lack of manufactured modular PT stone components
- The high cost of some early high-profile post-tensioned stone projects, notably Portcullis House
- Shortage of dimension-stone quarries that do routine strength testing and can give strength certificates for their stone components
- The need to develop better CAD-CAM software and hardware for automated CNC stone cutting of precise shapes. In the early 2020s, the dimension-stone industry in most countries was structured almost entirely for tiles and cladding.
- Existing workflows with concrete create a barrier to entry to a new material, which does not have the economies of scale of a new material like stone
- Unclear how to determine the design strength of stone, versus a homogenized material like concrete

== History ==
Tensioned stone has been used in a range of applications since antiquity. In the modern era, high-tension stone was used in a few structures in the 1990s, and its application was expanded in the 2010s in part due to awareness of the high carbon emissions associated with concrete.

Tensioned-stone footbridges with spans up to 40 m have been built in Japan, Switzerland, Germany, and Spain, and are sold commercially in spans of up to 20 m by Kusser Granitwerke.

=== Early uses of post-tensioned masonry ===
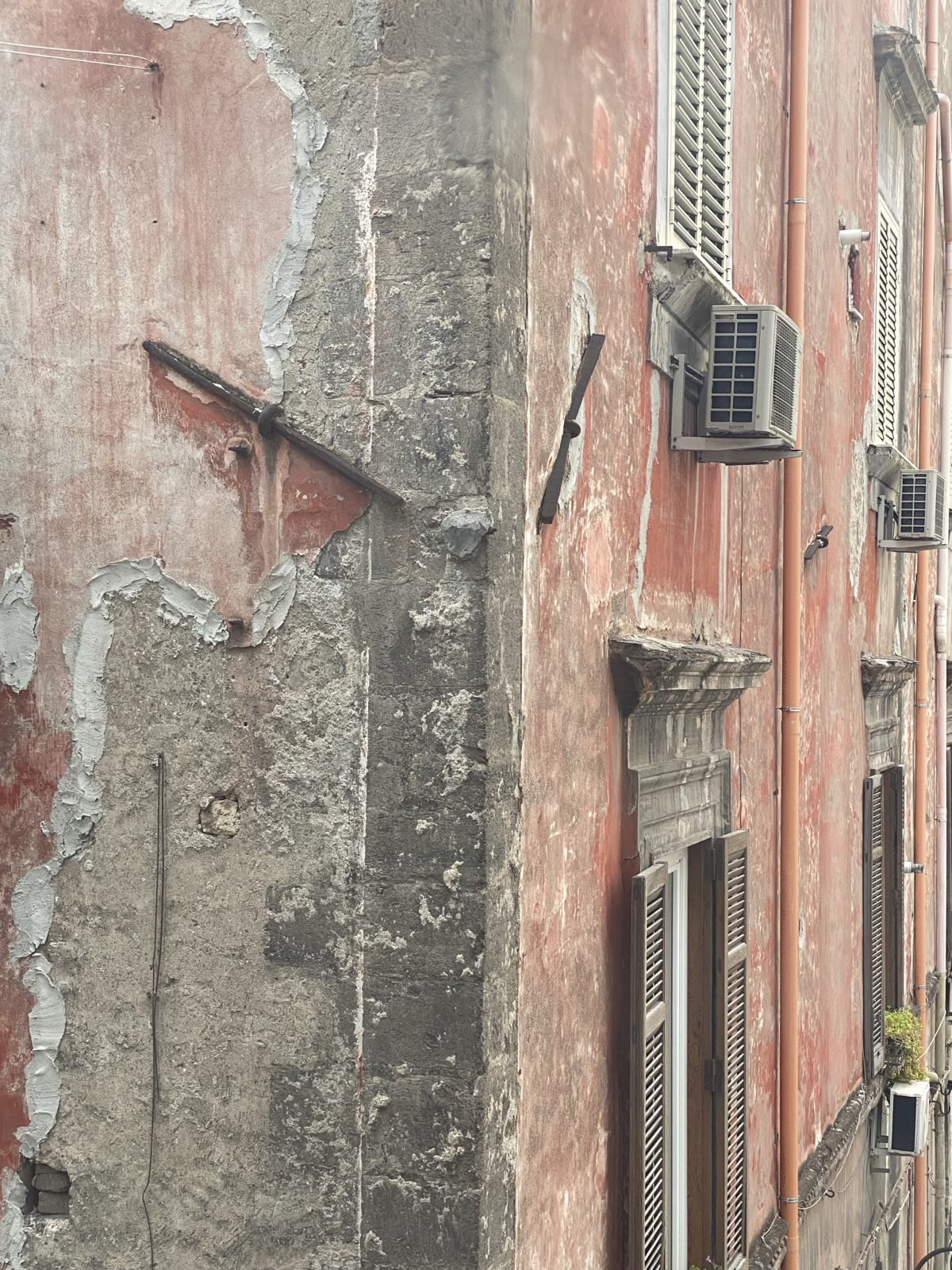
An early type of post-tensioned stone: seismic bolts stabilize a tuff and piperno stone building in Naples.

Tensioning using metal clamps across masonry joints is thought to have been used in stone construction since antiquity.

“Application of clamping techniques for structural stability has been well used in historical constructions. The architects of antiquity working in the medium of stone where there was no mortar used wooden or metal clamps to ascertain the position of the blocks and their stability. This is an age-old technique, first known in the Old Kingdom of Egypt. Later, it was used in Aegean Bronze Age architecture and in Asia Minor, Syria, and Mesopotamia. Egypt, Archaic Greece and contemporary Achaemenid Persia were the first to use clamps to any greater extent. The clamps had a shape of a double dovetail… Molten metal was poured into the cutting, and the resulting clamp was thus enforced by two or more vertical pegs acting as a prestressing force when the metal cooled… They were mainly used to resist lateral forces, i.e., earthquakes.”

Tensioning of masonry was used in the early 1800s: "In 1825 a posttensioning method for tunnelling under the River Thames was utilized in England. The project involved the construction of vertical tube caissons of 15m diameter and 21 m height. The 0.75m thick brick walls were reinforced and posttensioned with 25mm diameter wrought iron rods."

Seismic post-tensioning of brick and stone masonry buildings with steel bolts dates from at latest the 19th century, including following the Charleston earthquake of 1883, and on buildings in seismic regions of Italy. Seismic post-tensioning of masonry is done with considerably lower tension than pre-stressed concrete or modern tensioned stone.

In the mid-20th century, the Sydney Opera House shells were constructed from pre-cast concrete masonry beams that were assembled into a pointed-arch vault using post-tensioning. By 1982, post-tensioned masonry was sufficiently widespread to fill a book published by the Institution of Civil Engineers, though this was brick and precast concrete masonry. In 1985 and 1986, structural engineer Remo Pedreschi and others published studies of post-tensioned brick.

=== 1940s–1980s ===
After the development of high-tension jacks and post-tensioned concrete, stone was tested with prestressing under high-tension forces. In 1947, the Compagnons du Devoir tested the concept of post-tensioned stone, finding that an 8 m span could support a 7-t load.

In the 1960s–80s, Kluesner Engineering developed post-tensioned stone for use as external panels.

"Early experiments with posttensioned Indiana limestone units were sponsored by the Building Stone Institute in 1967 and by the Indiana Limestone Institute in 1970. In these programs, several posttensioned beams and slabs were fabricated and tested… The advantages of posttensioned stone are much the same as for concrete. It permits the stone to carry larger loads over longer spans than would be possible with conventional units. The stone units can be plant-fabricated in much larger units to span column to column in the building… A few structural applications have been built using beams for such building features as porticoes, where the live loads have been limited to roof loads and wind loads."

In the 1980s, the Rock of Ages Corporation developed Accu-Tensioned Granite Press Rolls for use in the paper industry. A column of granite was lathed and then drilled along its length, before the placement and tensioning of steel rods.

In the 1980s, the General Post Office of Sydney underwent a restoration that used reinforcement by post-tensioning the sandstone clock tower. As a result of the seismic reinforcement, the Sydney GPO has been claimed as the first post-tensioned stone building. The structural engineering was led by Colin Crisp of McBean and Crisp. "This technique of post tensioning an existing building is a world first and has raised international interest." As retrofitted seismic bolts were previously used, it appears likely that the GPO's priority claim relates to how the structural calculations guided the tendon placement and increased tension forces.

"A more than one hundred year old sandstone masonry building, … the GPO Tower will be strengthened with four vertical post-tensioning tendons, 19 diameter 0.5" strands each, and a number of horizontal prestressing bars diameter 35mm at floor levels. ... Special steel chairs will be used to anchor the tendons and spread the anchorage forces of 1,771 kN (400 kips). The anchorages of the unbonded tendons allow for monitoring and adjustment of the tendon forces to compensate volume changes of the sandstone, if necessary."

=== 1990s ===
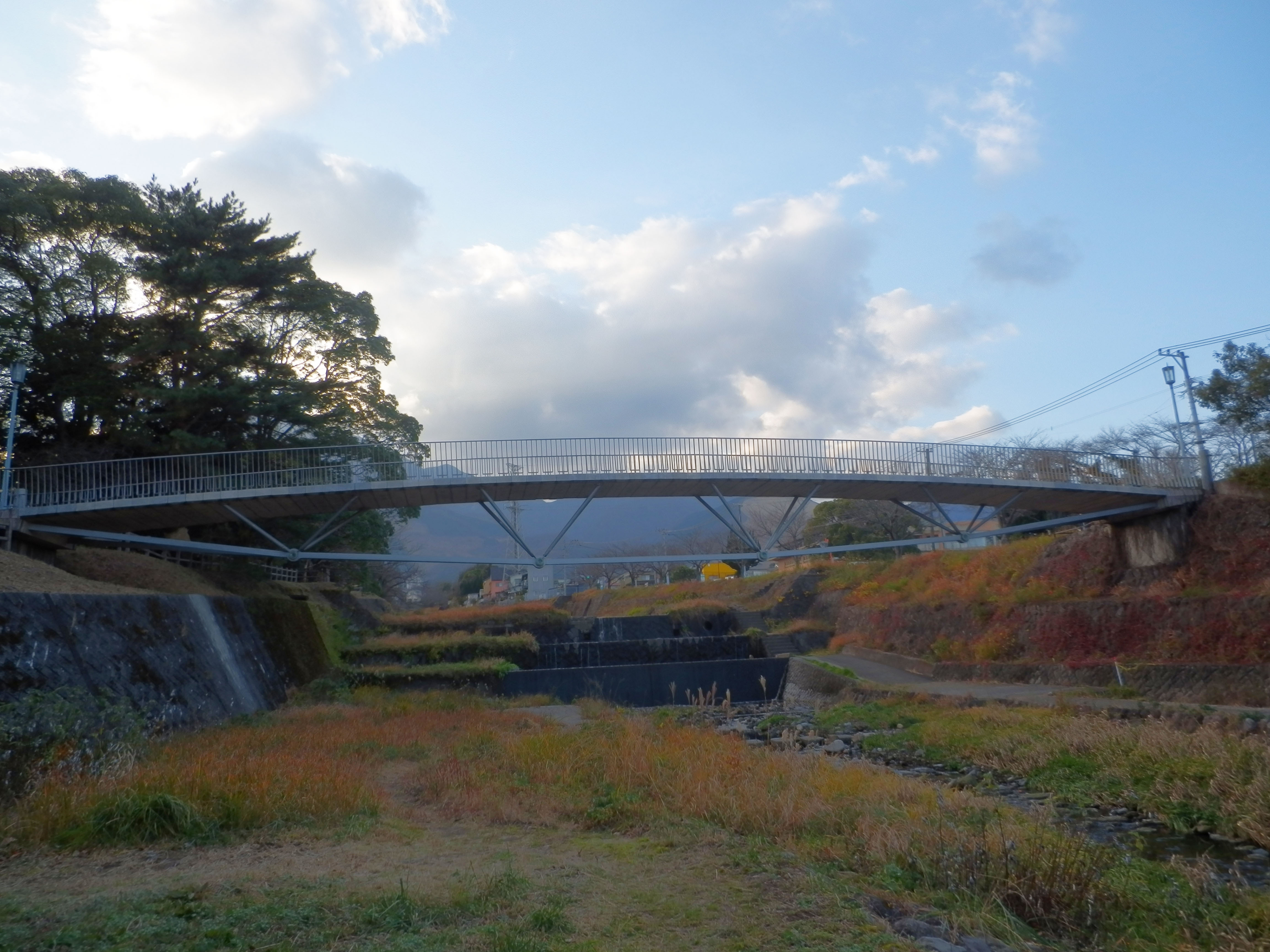
Post-tensioned stone Inachus Bridge in Beppu, Ōita, Kyushu

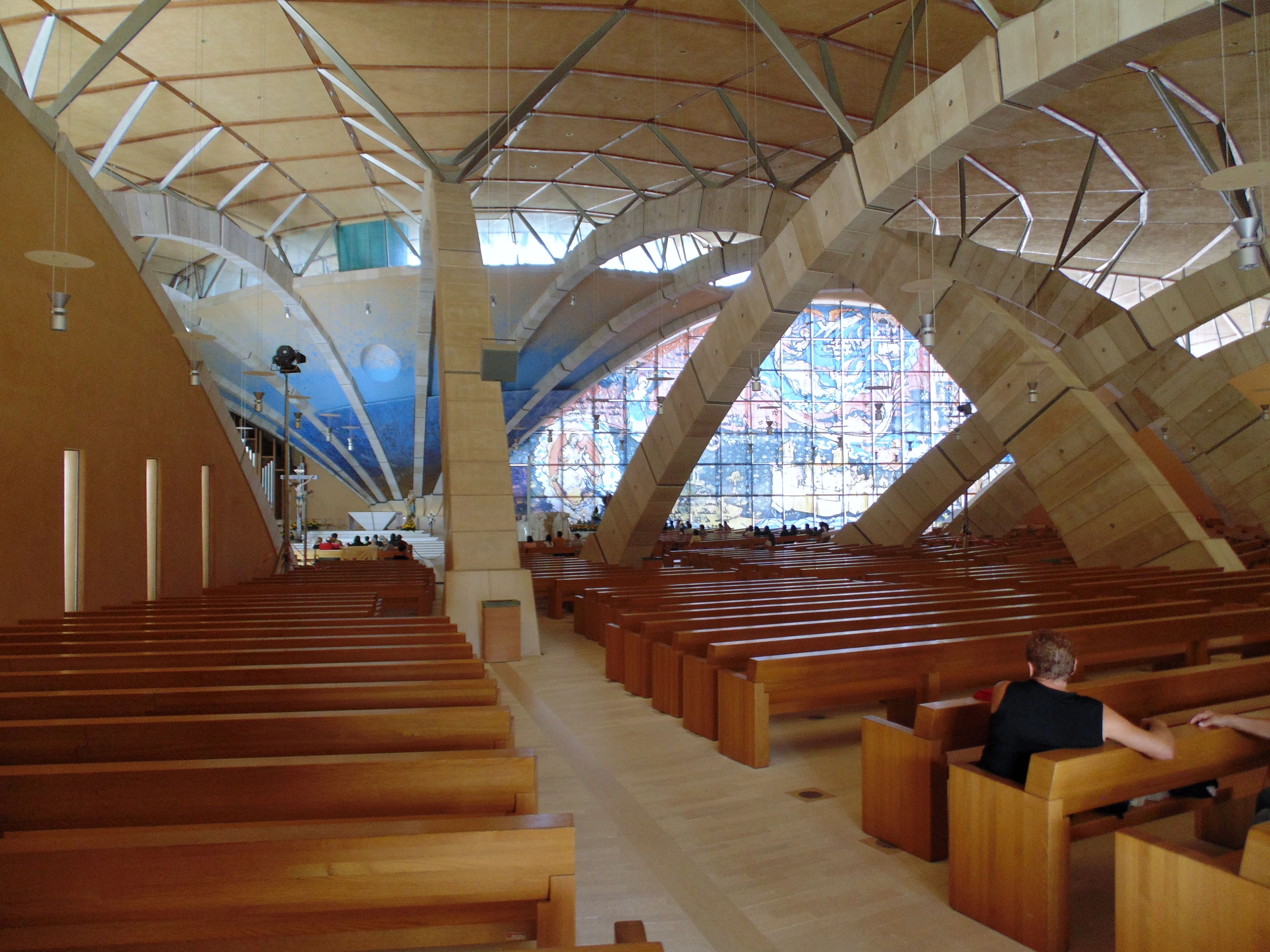
Massive post-tensioned stone arches in the Sanctuary of Saint Pio of Pietrelcina in San Giovanni Rotondo, Foggia, Italy

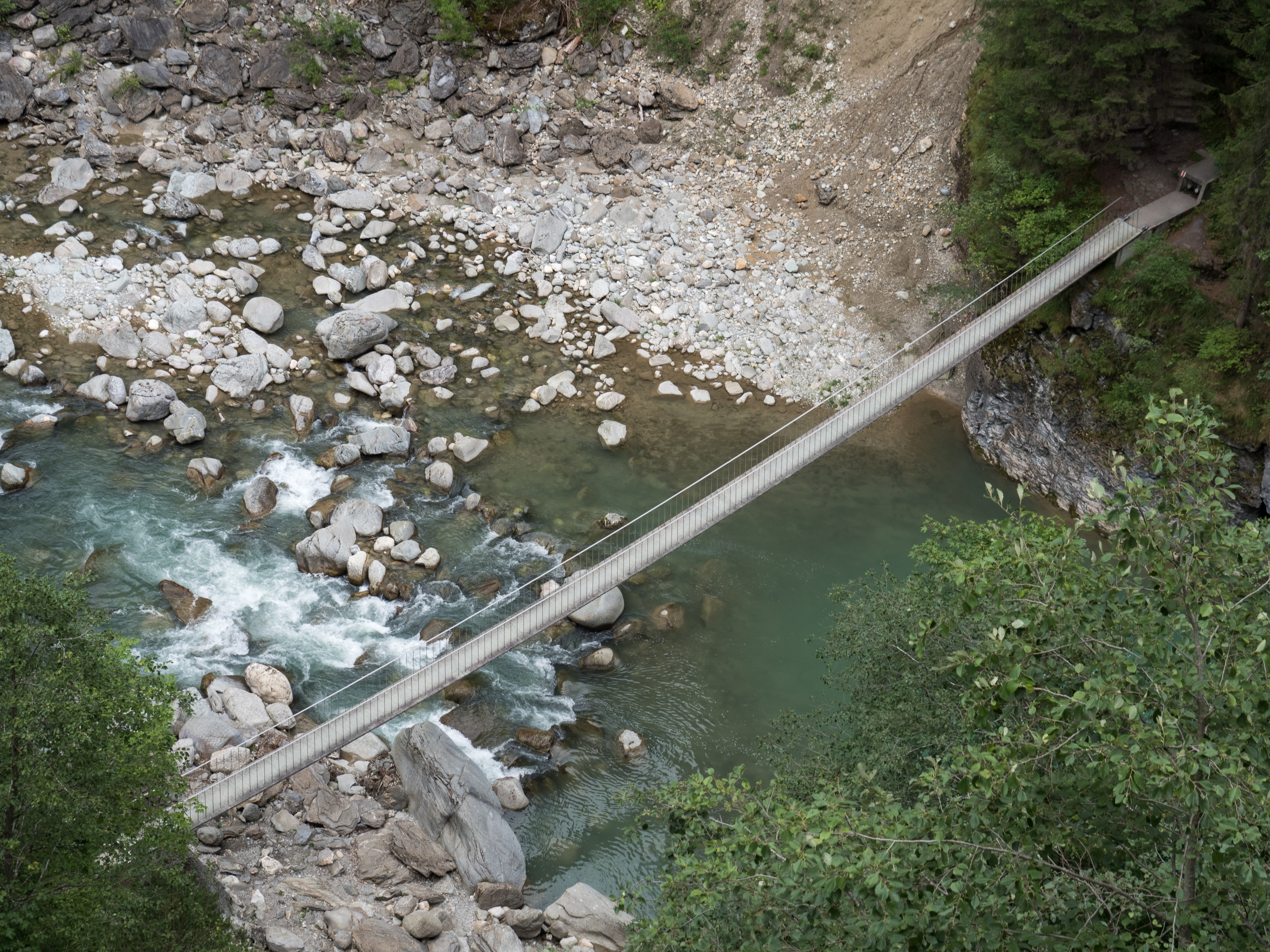
Post-tensioned stone bridge Punt da Suransuns, Switzerland

The first documented real-world use of post-tensioned stone in a new building was for the Pavilion of the Future, built in Seville for the Universal Exposition in 1992, designed by structural engineers Peter Rice and Tristram Carfrae of Ove Arup and Partners. Rice had worked on the Sydney Opera House, which was a major technical advance in part because of its use of pre-cast concrete masonry beams that were assembled into the pointed-arch superstructure using post-tensioning; this prior use of post-tensioned masonry may have contributed to Rice's use of post-tensioned stone decades later.

Designed and constructed between 1991 and 2004, the arches of a 6000 sqm Sanctuary of Saint Pio of Pietrelcina by architect Renzo Piano and structural engineering led by Maurizio Milan of Favero & Milan engineers and Arup Group.

Built in 1994, the 34 m-span Inachus footbridge in Oita, Japan uses post-tensioned stone, designed by engineer Mamoru Kawaguchi. "The bridge has a lenticular shape with an arched upper chord and a suspended lower chord, connected to each other by means of web members consisting of steel tubes arranged to form inverted pyramids."

Completed in 1995, Queen's Building at Emmanuel College, Cambridge by Hopkins Architects and Buro Happold with Ove Arup and Partners. "The columns were also used to provide lateral stability to the building and were post-tensioned using stainless steel rods attached directly to the foundations."

Completed in 1999, Punt da Suransuns in Switzerland, is a 40 m footbridge designed by civil engineers Jürg Conzett and Gianfranco Bronzini.

"Punt da Suransuns is a stress-ribbon bridge with a span of 40 m … constructed with slabs of Andeer granite, which are prestressed over rectangular steel bars … When traversing the bridge the vertical oscillation can be felt, but pedestrians have commented that the bridge is not as flexible as it looks."

Erected in 1999, Southwark Gateway Needle by Eric Parry is made of 25 blocks of Portland stone held 16m high by post-tensioning.

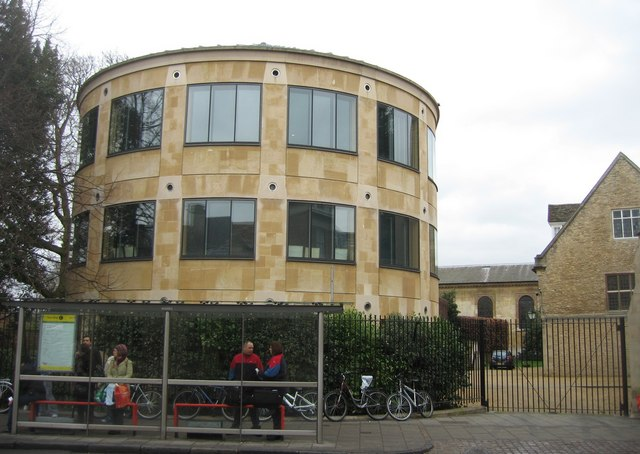
Queen's Building at Emmanuel College, Cambridge was the first completed new building that used internally post-tensioned stone.

=== 2000s ===
Portcullis House, a building of the UK Parliament, was completed in 2001. It was designed by Hopkins Architects. This building represented a setback in PT stone's cost reputation, as the overall building ran overbudget.

In 2002, 30 Finsbury Square was completed by Eric Parry Architects and Whitbybird engineers. "The columns were constructed conventionally and left to set for 7 days prior to post-tensioning."

In 2004, Kusser Graniteworks started manufacturing post-tensioned granite–diorite flagpoles.

In 2005, a prototype of the first post-tensioned spiral stone staircase was made, called "Escalier Ridolfi". It was designed by Claudio D'Amato and Giuseppe Fallacara.

In 2006, the full-scale Escalier Ridolfi staircase was presented at the Venice Biennale of Architecture, constructed by Ateliers Romeo stonemasons

In 2007, Kusser Granitwerke constructed their first tensioned stone footbridge, in Rosenheim.

Completed in 2009, a building on Southampton Row, designed by Sheppard Robson architects, used post-tensioned stone.

=== 2010s ===
Starting in 2011, award-winning high-tensile stone staircases for luxury residences were constructed through a collaboration between stonemason Pierre Bidaud and structural engineer Steve Webb,

In 2013, Giuseppe Fallacara and Marco Stigliano demonstrated a "tensegrilithic" prototype, combining stone with steel rods and cables into a tensegrity structure.

From 2019, Webb Yates engineers used extended horizontal stone lintels in residential construction, and proof-of-principle stone flooring panels.

A 330˚ helix staircase was designed by Foster and Partners for the 2019-completed Dolunay Villa in Turkey. and constructed by the Stonemasonry Company with Webb Yates.

=== 2020s ===
In 2020, IABSE awarded the Milne Medal to Steve Webb for his innovations using low-carbon materials in structural engineering, including wood and tensioned stone.

In 2022, Jürg Conzett and Gianfranco Bronzini were awarded the Swiss Grand Award for Art (Architecture) to recognize their body of work, which includes a number of tensioned-stone footbridges, including Punt da Suransuns (1999), the Waterfall bridge along the Trutg dil Flem trail, and Orrido di Cavaglia (2021). Many of their tensioned-stone projects use gneiss, a stone widely quarried in Switzerland.

In 2024, the Royal Academy of Arts summer exhibition displayed a stone–steel space frame (3D truss) made from cored, tensioned cylinders of limestone and steel joints.

"Imagine crane masts, bridges or space frames like the Eden Centre and Stadium Australia being formed with stone elements instead of steel. With a world-saving 75 per cent carbon reduction, inherent durability and fire resistance, we can put waste stone to use and make some really pretty structures." —Steve Webb

Due for completion in 2026, the Sagrada Familia cathedral under construction in Barcelona in partnership with the Arup Group uses post-tensioned stone assemblies. "Jordi Faulí, the architect in charge of La Sagrada Familia in Barcelona, has stated that they will implement this technique for 800 panels that form part of the central towers of the basilica; in fact, prestressing will allow for a higher resistance to winds with less weight." Using post-tensioning allows the construction to avoid using stone-cladded concrete and speeds up construction. Structural engineer Tristram Carfrae of Arup is leading the engineering effort.

== See also ==
- Eugène Freyssinet
- Glossary of prestressed concrete terms
- Renzo Piano
- Peter Rice
- Precast concrete
- Prestressed concrete
- Tristram Carfrae
