= 15 Clerkenwell Close =

London building

Coordinates: 51.5232°N 0.1064°W

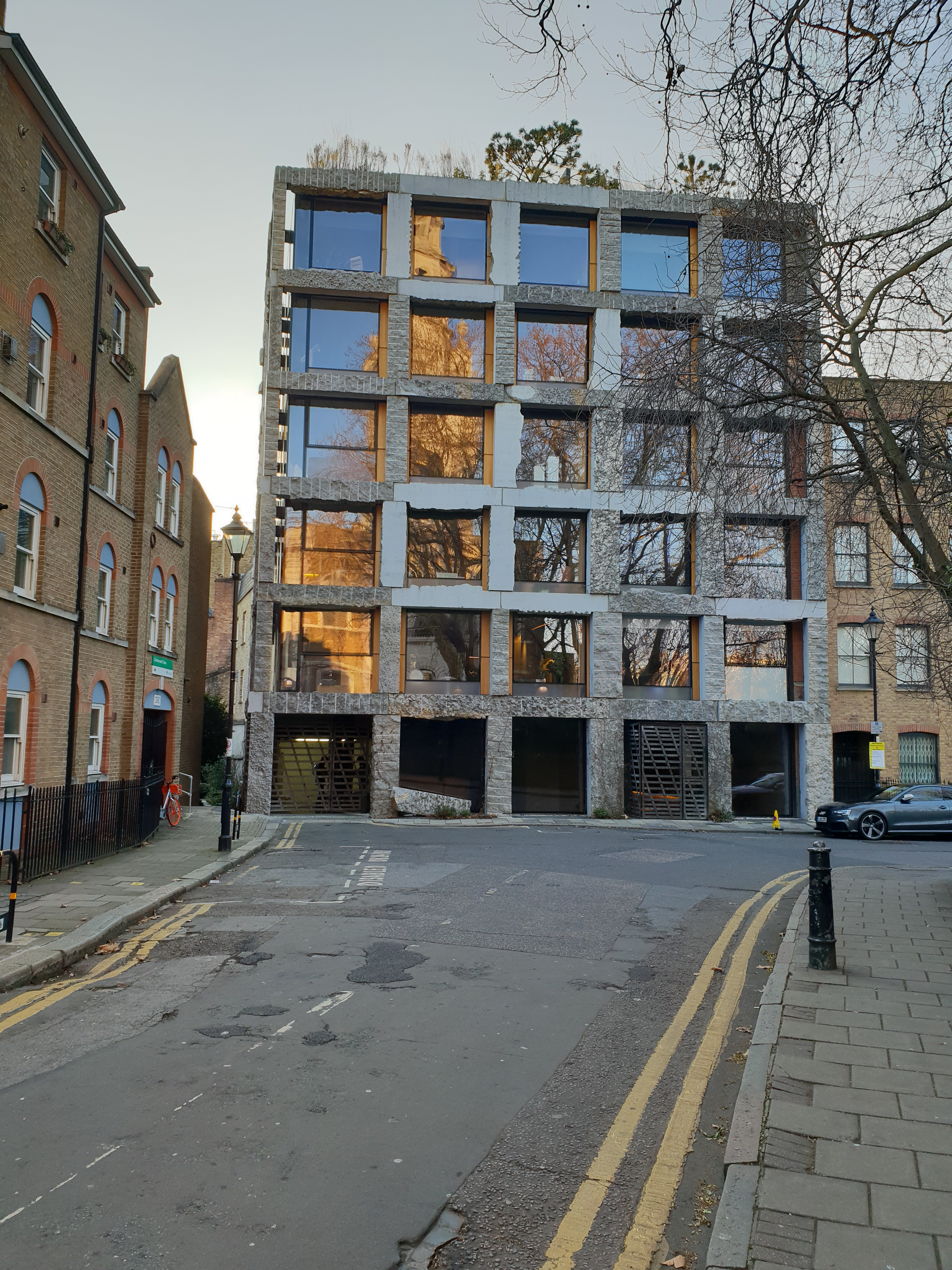
- Interactive map of the 15 Clerkenwell Close area

General information
- Type: Mixed-use
- Location: Clerkenwell, London, United Kingdom
- Completed: 2017
- Cost: £4.4 million

Design and construction
- Architect: Amin Taha

15 Clerkenwell Close is a building in Islington, London, designed by architect Amin Taha with structural engineer Webb Yates Engineers, completed in 2017. The building's stone façade was controversial when it appeared, as it had not been fully detailed in the building's planning documents. Islington Council called for the building's demolition, but this was overturned on appeal. The building won a RIBA National Award in 2018 and was one of six buildings shortlisted for the Stirling Prize in 2021. The building is highly innovative, using the first construction of a multi-level trabeated system of end-shaped, rusticated massive-precut stone blocks.

== History ==
Taha originally proposed a building with a bronze façade in 2012. Taha then replaced this design with one utilising bricks before settling on stone. During construction, Islington council indicated that the brick façade was the chosen one on its website, apparently due to an error. The council had received and approved designs for the stone façade, but because they were never placed online for the public to see, the final façade was a surprise to neighbours.

Islington Council issued a ruling that the building be demolished in mid-2017 due to the error, which the council withdrew after an inquiry from a legal team employed by Taha. After rescinding the first order to demolish the structure, the council issued a second in February 2018, following "an investigation" that determined the building's final design differed from the approved design. This order cited the location of the fossils within the stone façade as "[...] deleterious to the conservation area and listed buildings" due to their "haphazard" placement.

In August 2019, Taha's appeal was successful and the council's planning office granted planning permission, ruling that the building "accords with the generality of what had previously been approved" and removed the demolition order.

Taha lives on the top floor of the building with his family, and the building houses the offices of his architectural practice Groupwork.

== Design ==
Taha cites Alvar Aalto, Carlo Scarpa and Ludwig Mies van der Rohe as inspirations for the structure.

=== Massive-precut stone exoskeleton ===
The building has a load-bearing massive-precut stone exoskeleton, with visible fossils embedded in the limestone façade. The limestone was sourced from Normandy, and acts as a supportive "exoskeleton" for the building, meaning the outer area of the interior does not require columns or other supports; the core of the building is supported by a reinforced-concrete column containing the lifts and staircase. Use of limestone sourced from Normandy was inspired by the site's original structure, an 11th-century Norman abbey, also built from limestone, unusual for that time. The building includes a small public park to its left.

In the context of other massive-precut stone buildings which have typically used smooth-faced ashlars, 15 Clerkenwell Close introduced two innovations. First, the blocks are only dimensioned at the ends. This yields both a cost benefit, by reducing expensive dimension cuts, and a style benefit, leaving the rusticated surfaces intact. Second, instead of a wall, it deploys the blocks as an exoskeleton.

=== Blue–Green roof ===
To solve the city's requirement for water capture, the roof holds water in both tanks and a garden.

== Reception ==
Ann Pembroke, of the Clerkenwell Green Preservation Society, said she was "appalled" by its aesthetic departure from the surrounding buildings, adding that "If you want to do something outrageous don't choose a medieval close to put it in." However, as Taha and others have pointed out, most of the buildings in the close are postwar structures built following ahistorical guidelines from brick or brick-veneer. "Ironically, its immediate context is a rather dim mix of 1980s faux Victorian brick housing, which is as dull as anything you might see in a far-flung suburb." The original medieval structures would have been primarily timber and stone, with the Norman abbey being made from limestone.

“The limestone we’ve used, sourced in Normandy, is from a similar seam of limestone used for the Norman nunnery and St James’s. When the Normans first came to England, they brought limestone across the sea, wrapped in wet rags to stop it calcifying and make it easier to carve. So we’re referencing the site’s history with the materials used.”

In 2018, the building was nominated for the Carbuncle Cup, and was described as an "ugly fake fossil stone monstrosity" by a planning-committee councillor.

However, reception from the architectural establishment was positive. Critic Edwin Heathcote called it "“perhaps the most sophisticated, witty and thoughtful new building in London in years”. In 2018 it won both a RIBA London Award and a RIBA National Award. In 2021, it was shortlisted for the Stirling Prize.

Despite the council's hostility to 15 Clerkenwell, Groupwork's 168 Upper Street, also in Islington, was approved by the borough's planning committee.

The building was featured as part of Taha's collaborative exhibition at The Building Centre in 2020.
