= La Tourette (Marseille) =

Housing complex in Marseille, France

Coordinates: 43.2973°N 5.3648°E

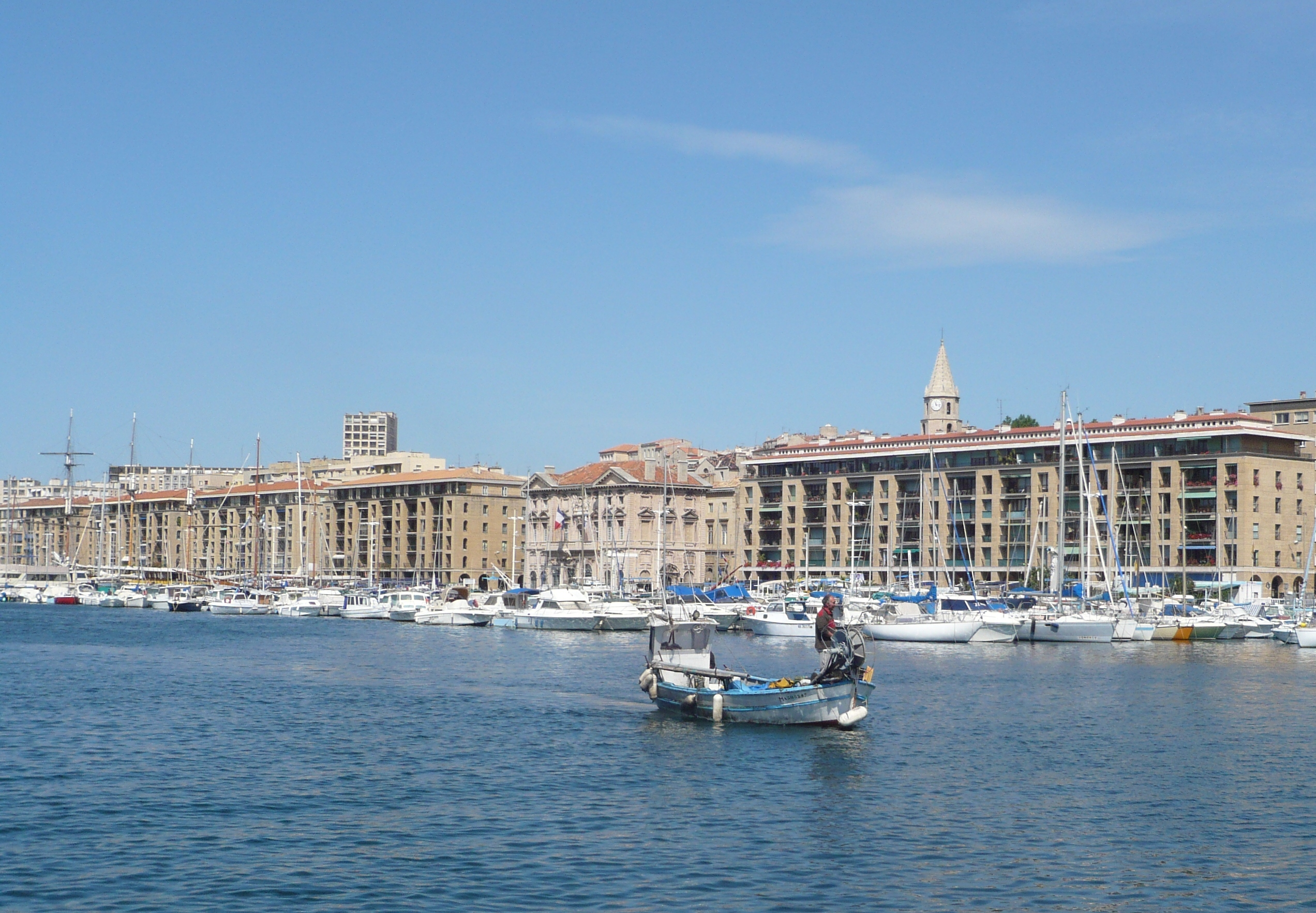
Marseille's Vieux Port and buildings by Pouillon

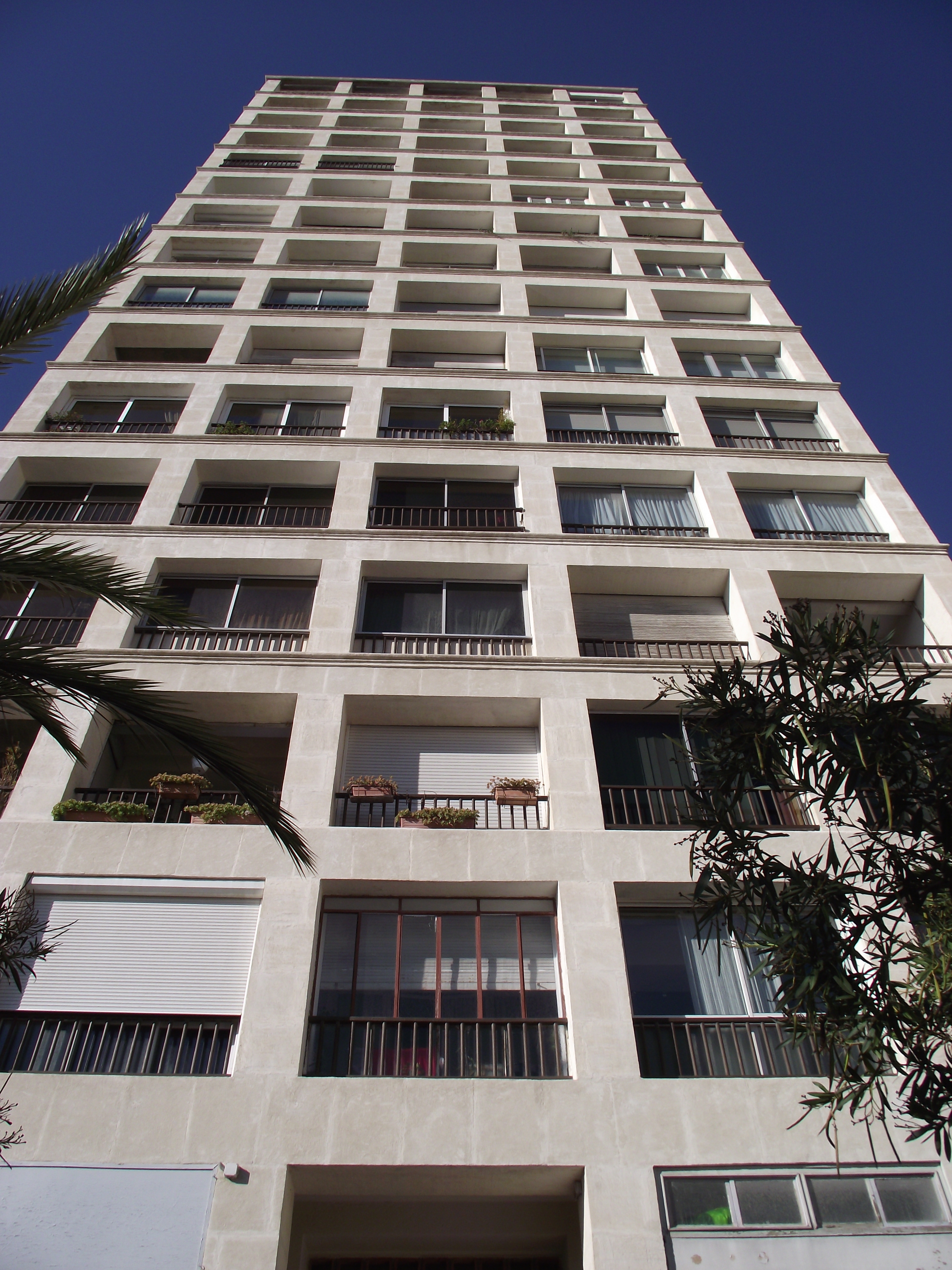
The first modern load-bearing stone skyscraper, 2 Rue Saint-Laurent, a 16-storey apartment building in La Tourette (Marseille), designed by Fernand Pouillon

La Tourette is a housing complex in Marseille, France. It is located at the Old Port of Marseille and was constructed in 1946–1953 following designs by the French architect and urban planner Fernand Pouillon.

== Construction technology ==
La Tourette and Vieux-Port developments are examples of modern massive-precut stone construction, one of the recent methods in stone construction.

La Tourette includes the first stone skyscraper, 2 Rue Saint-Laurent, a 16-storey tower made from load-bearing massive precut stone.

== Design philosophy ==
The architect Pouillon believed that "The more modest the housing, the more monumental the architecture should be.". The construction process at La Tourette was used by Pouillon to support his claim that he could "build 200 dwellings in 200 days within a budget of 200 million francs.".
