= Maurizio Milan =

Italian engineer (born 1952)

- Born: 21 July; Mirano, Italy

Maurizio Milan (born 21 July 1952) is an Italian engineer. He works in collaboration with world-famous architects such as Von Gerkan, Marg und Partner, Arata Isozaki, Rem Koolhaas, Herzog & de Meuron, Michele De Lucchi, Matteo Thun, Bolles+Wilson, Mario Cucinella. A long-time consultant of Renzo Piano, he has taken part in numerous projects of the Italian architect.

== Career ==
Born in Mirano, Venice, in 1952, Maurizio Milan graduated in Civil Engineering from the University of Padua in 1977 and started his career designing concrete and steel prefabricated structures. In 1982, he founded “Favero&Milan” engineering firm which he left in 2013 to set up “Milan Ingegneria S.r.l.”, within which he is continuing to perform his professional activity. His experience ranges from concept design to final work delivery to the client, along with structural engineering, site supervision and Economic and Environmental Management. He has taken part in the design of numerous projects both in Italy and abroad in collaboration with world-famous architects, completing over one thousand works to the day. From 2002 to 2008 he was professor in the Structural Engineering Master's Programme at the Polytechnic University of Milan. Since 2007, he has been teaching Structural Design at the IUAV University in Venice and, since 2013, he has been tutoring the six young architects of Senator Renzo Piano’s G124 working group, who will be involved in the transformation of Italian suburbs. He is part of the "Casa Italia" project initiated by Prime Minister of Italy Paolo Gentiloni on April 8, 2017, with the aim of determining the criteria for the prevention and safeguarding of Italian building and infrastructure heritage during natural disasters with particular regard to earthquakes.

== Working philosophy ==
The common thread in all Maurizio Milan's work can be summarised in a motto: “Complex problems need simple solutions”. His work has always been characterised by research and experimentation in a constant attempt to offer structural solutions which are both coherent with the architectural design of a project and rigorous from the point of view of safety and functionality. Despite his vocation as a structural engineer, Maurizio Milan has dedicated his career to interpreting the intimate connection between the architectural and structural design, the functional distribution of spaces and the economic sustainability of every project he has been involved in.

== Selected projects ==
- “Prometeo” Musical space, Venice (Italy)
- Roof of the “San Nicola” Stadium, Bari (Italy)
- “Marco Polo” Airport, Venice (Italy)
- Exhibition centre in Rimini (Italy)
- “Padre Pio” Church in San Giovanni Rotondo, Foggia (Italy)
- Falconara Airport, Ancona (Italy)
- Ice hockey stadium for the Turin 2006 Winter Olympics, Turin (Italy)
- “Luna Rossa” America's cup operational base, Valencia (Spain)
- “Vulcano Buono” service centre in Nola, Naples (Italy)
- “La Rocca” winery in Gavorrano, Grosseto (Italy)
- European Library of Information and Culture, Milan (Italy)
- “Triennale Design Museum” bridge, Milan (Italy)
- “Bridge of Peace”, Tbilisi (Georgia)
- Emilio Vedova exhibition area inside the former “Magazzini del sale”, Venice(Italy)
- Conference Centre in Rimini (Italy)
- Ministry of Justice, Batumi (Georgia)
- Temporary Concert Hall, L’Aquila (Italia)
- “Basilica Palladiana” Restoration, Vicenza (Italy)
- Wind generator prototype (Italy)
- Bagrati Cathedral Restoration, Kutaisi (Georgia)
- Diogene – Minimalist self-contained living unit (Germany)
- “Le Albere”: Ex-Michelin Area Redevelopment, Trento (Italy)
