= Can Lis =

House in Majorca, Spain

Coordinates: 39°21′10″N 03°12′25″E

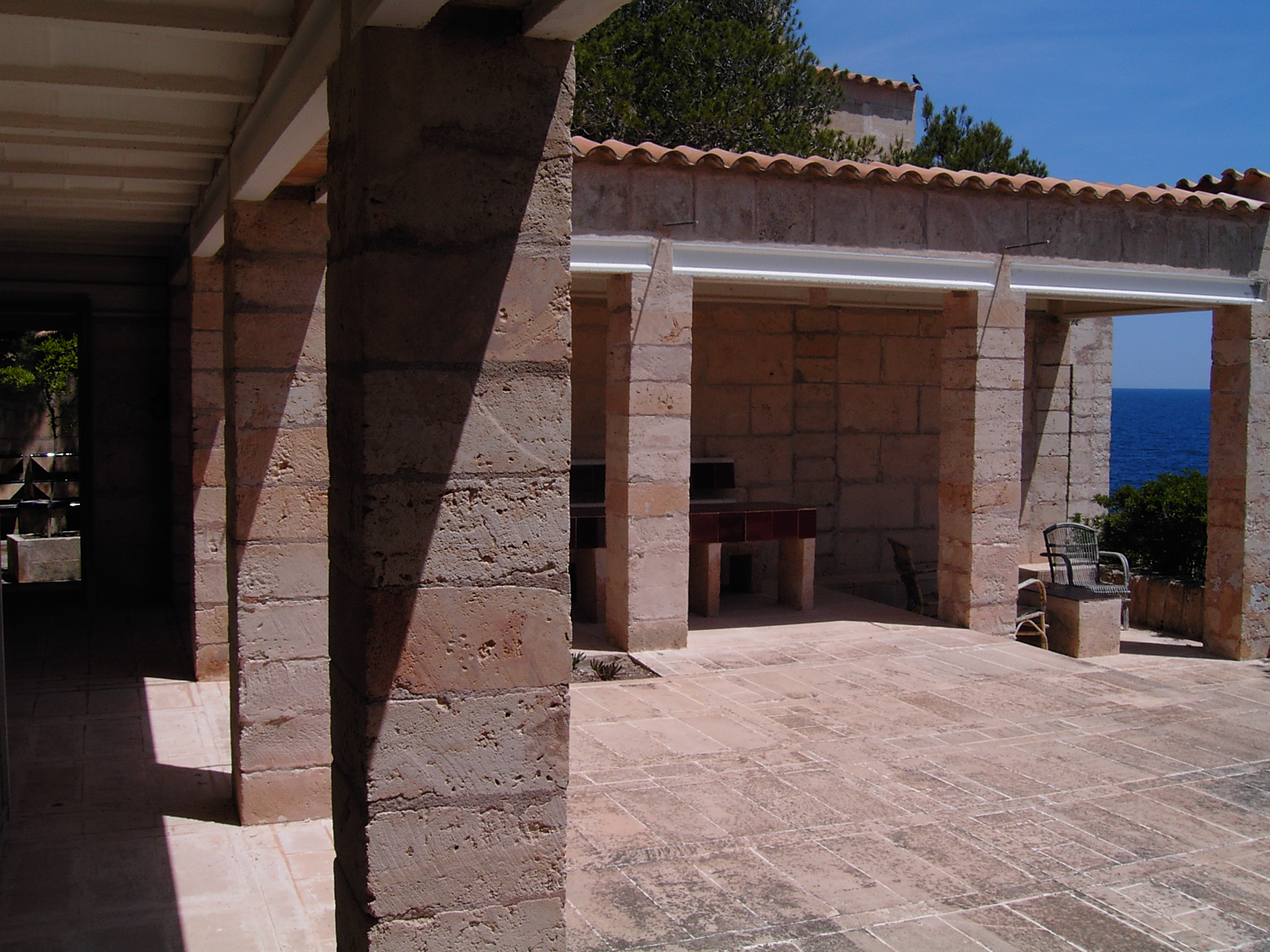
Can Lis, Majorca

Can Lis is a house the Danish architect Jørn Utzon built for his wife Lis and himself near Portopetro on the Spanish island of Majorca. Completed in 1971, it consists of four separate blocks linked together by walls and courtyards.

== History ==
Utzon visited Majorca in 1966 when returning from Australia after disagreements with the authorities about how to complete his iconic Sydney Opera House. He was enchanted by the island and decided to build a summer residence there. The basic concept of the villa is similar to the design for the house Utzon had intended to build in Sydney: a number of pavilions arranged to serve the different functions of the building.

== Architecture ==
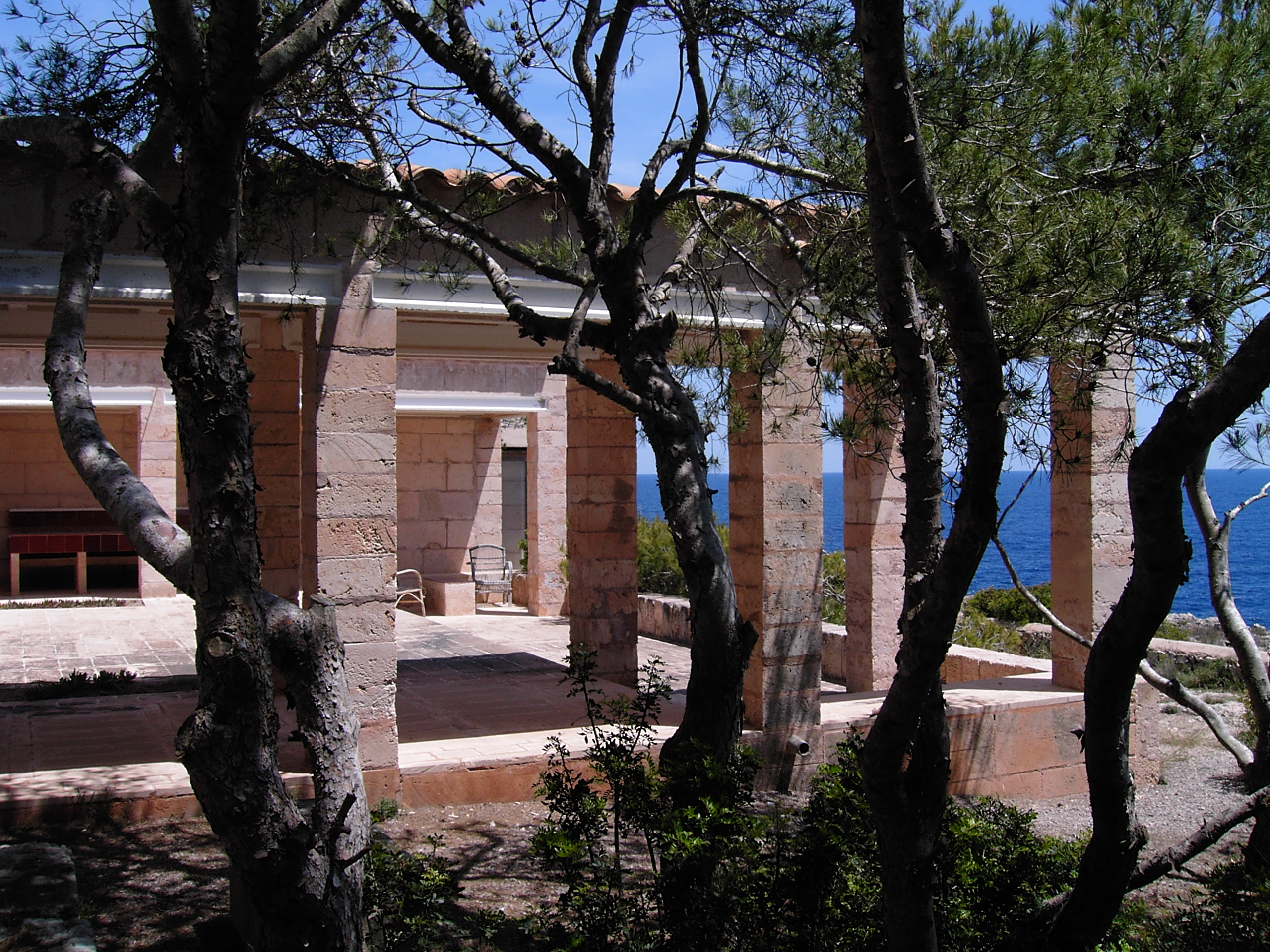
Loggias provide shade from the sun

Located on the top of a cliff on the island's south coast, the house is built in the area's yellowish-pink sandstone, known locally as marés stone, making it blend into the landscape. The concrete roof is capped with of yellow tiles while the gables are crafted in the Chinese style, like those of the Fredensborg Houses. The four separate blocks are linked together with walls and courtyards. From west to east, the first block houses the kitchen, dining room and study, the second the living room, the third the bedrooms and the fourth contains a guest suite. All face the sea with slightly different orientations following the line of the cliffs. Utzon prepared preliminary sketches and drawings but these were underwent changes as the building grew. The result is a house that makes optimum use of light and views. Utzon's approach is reminiscent of the experience he had gained in Finland where he saw how Alvar Aalto had built the Villa Mairea, altering the design along the way. The light in Majorca is sharp and bright. Can Lis has a number of areas where loggias and projecting roofs provide the necessary shade. The window frames, mounted on the exterior surface of the walls, stimulate the effect of light inside the house. Most of the furniture is also made of stone, sculpted into shelving, tables, chairs and benches.

In his extensive monograph on Utzon, Richard Weston considers Can Lis to be "one of the finest houses built in the twentieth century." He further comments: "Uniting mental and physical order, geometry and building, Utzon has made a house unmistakenly modern in technique and sensibility yet seemingly as natural and ordinary as the sun, stone and sea whose intercourse it celebrates."

== Later developments ==
The Utzons kept Can Lis as their Majorca residence for almost 20 years, living there for extensive periods as they grew older. They finally decided to build a second house on the island, Can Feliz, at a more remote location, as they were increasingly bothered by the continual pounding of the waves, the glare of the sun, and intrusions by tourists and architecture enthusiasts who wandered through the site. Can Lis was used for many years by their children. Recently, in collaboration with the Utzon Foundation, the Danish Architectural Foundation has now made the house available to architects wishing to stay there for periods of at least one month.

== Literature ==
- Martin Keiding and Kim Dirckinck-Holmfeld (ed.), Utzon's own houses, Utzon Library, Copenhagen, Danish Architectural Press, 2004, 106 pages. ISBN 87-7407-316-8
