= Can Feliz =

Coordinates: 39°25′17″N 03°11′29″E

Can Feliz is a summer residence the Danish architect Jørn Utzon built for himself near Portopetro on the Spanish island of Mallorca. Completed in 1994 and located a few kilometres inland on a mountain side near S'Horta, it is the second house Utzon built on the island. Like the earlier Can Lis, it is built in the local sandstone and consists of separate blocks for living, eating and sleeping.

== Background ==
Utzon visited Mallorca in 1966 when returning from Australia after disagreements with the authorities about how to complete his iconic Sydney Opera House. He was enchanted by the island and decided to build a summer residence there. Can Lis, completed in 1971, stands on the top of a cliff near Portopetro. By the 1990s, the Utzons were spending much of their time there but they were increasingly bothered by the glare of the sun, the pounding of the waves and architects coming to see the house. Utzon therefore decided to build a second house, this time on a more remote, inland site. He took an active part in building the house as he had at Can Lis, making quite substantial changes along the way. Utzon presented the house to his wife Lis on the occasion of their golden wedding, wrapping a red ribbon around the building.

== Architecture ==
The design of Can Feliz is similar to that of Can Lis in that it is built in blocks, one for living and working, the second for the kitchen and dining room, and the third for bedrooms. But unlike Can Lis, it is built round a terrace like the island's local dwellings, and has just one tiled roof covering all three sections. The living room, lit by three lofty bay windows looking out over the countryside and the sea beyond, is a large theatre-like space divided into two levels separated by four or five steps. The upper area is designed for work with large wooden bookcases and a huge work table while an equally large sofa and five simple white-upholstered rocking chairs are spread across the lower level. Many of the houses furnishings are also made of local stone, faced with glazed blue-patterned tiling. On the southern side of the building, there is a large covered terrace which leads onto a series of interlinked platforms down to the swimming pool. On the northern side, there is also a loggia and patio. The entire building is more carefully finished, detracting somewhat from the originality of Can Lis. But the house is an unequalled study in the relationship between structure and light. Furthermore, it fits perfectly into the surroundings, demonstrating Utzon's gift for adapting buildings to their natural environment.

Although the building occupies some 400 to 500 square metres (4,300 to 5,400 sq ft), only about 150 square metres (1,600 sq ft) is devoted to actual indoor living space. The house is sparsely furnished. There are no pictures on the walls, just books on the shelves in the various rooms, and the only decoration comes from the glazed blue and black tiles on sections of the walls. Overall, the house gives an impression of timelessness.

== Can Feliz today ==
The house is currently occupied by Utzon's daughter Lin who is a ceramics designer.

== See also ==
- Utzon's House in Hellebæk

== Literature ==
- Martin Keiding and Kim Dirckinck-Holmfeld (ed.), Utzon's own houses, Utzon Library, Copenhagen, Danish Architectural Press, 2004, 106 pages. ISBN 87-7407-316-8
