= Ferschweiler Plateau =

Coordinates: 49°51′21″N 6°24′32″E

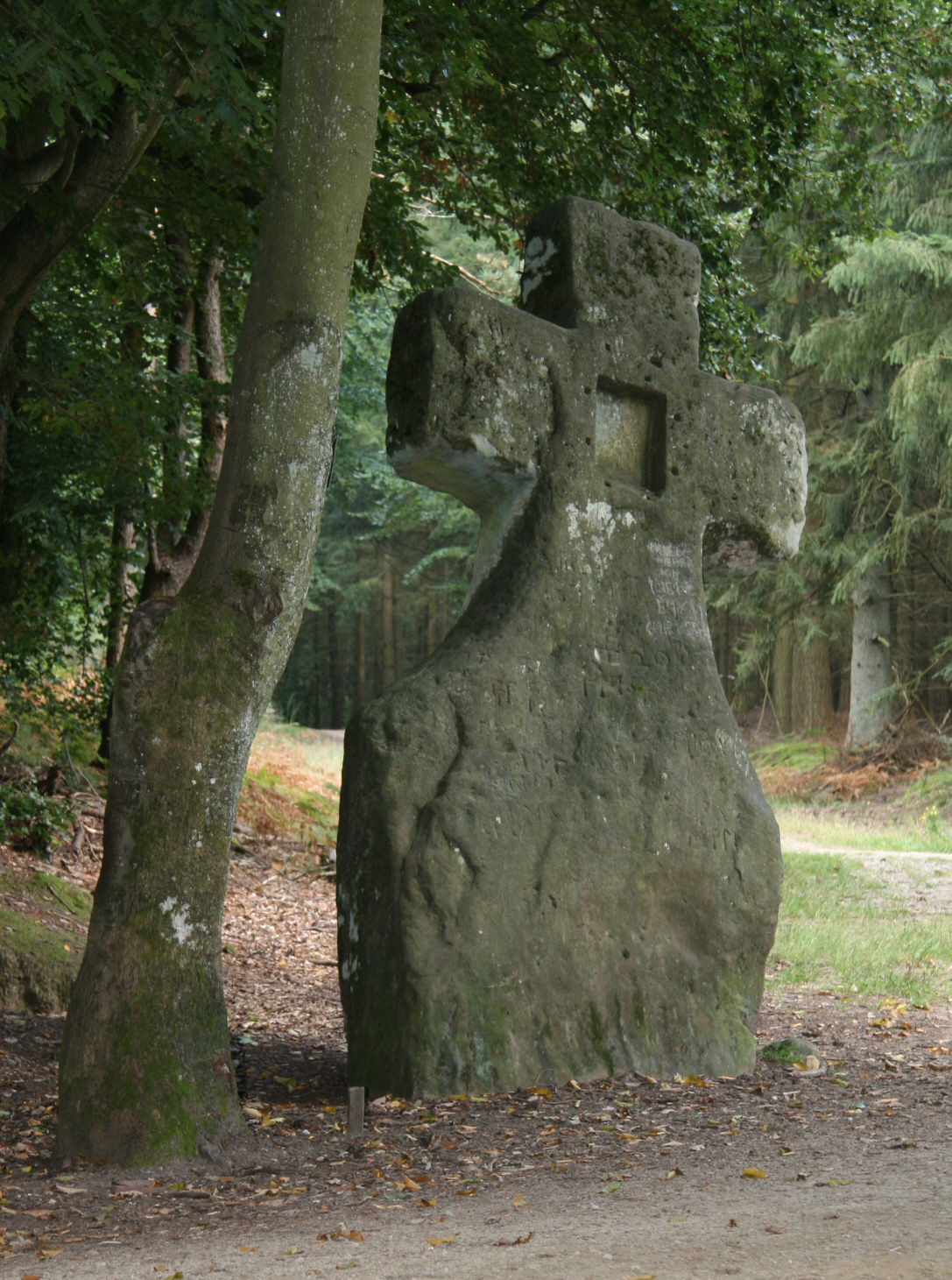
Fraubillen cross

The Ferschweiler Plateau, which is home to the villages of Ferschweiler and Ernzen among others, is an extensive highland area made from sandstone and is located in the collective municipality of Irrel in the county of Bitburg-Prüm in the German state of Rhineland-Palatinate. From a landscape perspective the Ferschweiler Plateau lies within the South Eifel, a region in the Eifel Mountains.

The Ferschweiler Plateau is well known for its many Neolithic (New Stone Age) sites. Important sites include the Fraubillen cross which was originally from the megalithic culture and, according to the missionary, Willibrord, was re-fashioned by hand from a menhir over 4.50 metres high, but is now only 3.50 metres high. Also noteworthy are the Langstein ("Long Stone") and the Druidenstein ("Druid Rock"). At the back of the plateau is the Devil's Gorge as well as Neolithic and a Gallo-Roman grave field.

The Ferschweiler Plateau is an escarpment (like the smaller neighbouring plateaux of Bollendorf and Wolsfeld) that was formed rom the porous Luxembourg Sandstone from the Jurassic (Lias li2), most of which lies on the largely impervious layers of the Upper Triassic (keuper).

== Literature ==
- Wolfgang Spielmann (2007), Das Ferschweiler Plateau (in German), ISBN 978-3-925533-17-4
- H. Wolfgang Wagner; et al. (2012), Trier und Umgebung (in German), vol. Band 60 (3rd, fully revised ed.), Stuttgart: Borntraeger, ISBN 978-3-443-15094-5
