= Womb tomb =

Neolithic burial site

The term Womb Tomb (also, womb-tomb) is a form of Neolithic burial site. Europe's prehistory stretches for some 9500 years, from the earliest settlers after the last ice age to around AD 1000. Very little is known of the earliest human burials. The first grave structure of any type dates from circa 4000 BCE. Neolithic farmers had a strong tradition of building burial chambers covered by mounds. Unique burial sites suggest a reverence for birth and the female form. These are called Womb Tombs and are a subset of passage graves or passage tombs. Recent studies show that many of the Neolithic passage graves in Scotland and Ireland were built using the symbolism of the female human womb.

Womb tomb is also a generic term for more recent burial sites that are frequented by Christian and Muslim pilgrims. The term has resonance in Christianity where in the creation story of mankind, God tells Adam:" In the sweat of thy face shalt thou eat bread, till thou return unto the ground; for out of it wast thou taken: for dust thou art, and unto dust shalt thou return." (Book of Genesis -Genesis 3:19); also Book of Job- (Job 1:21) . Jewish and other pre-Christian sources have similar references.

== Evidence ==
=== Popular culture ===
With the possible exception of Ireland, Scotland has the largest number of well-preserved chambered burial tombs in Europe. Archaeological and semiotic studies show that the internal and external architecture of tombs conform to a standard pattern: a chamber, a passage (or a passage shaped chamber), and an entrance representing a simplified view of the female reproductive organs. Reference has been made in literature to the idea that the Neolithic burial rites involved a return to the mother - the female. William Shakespeare makes an oblique reference to the idea. D. H. Lawrence, when discussing fertility, used this idea where he described his visits to first millennium BC Tombs north of Rome.

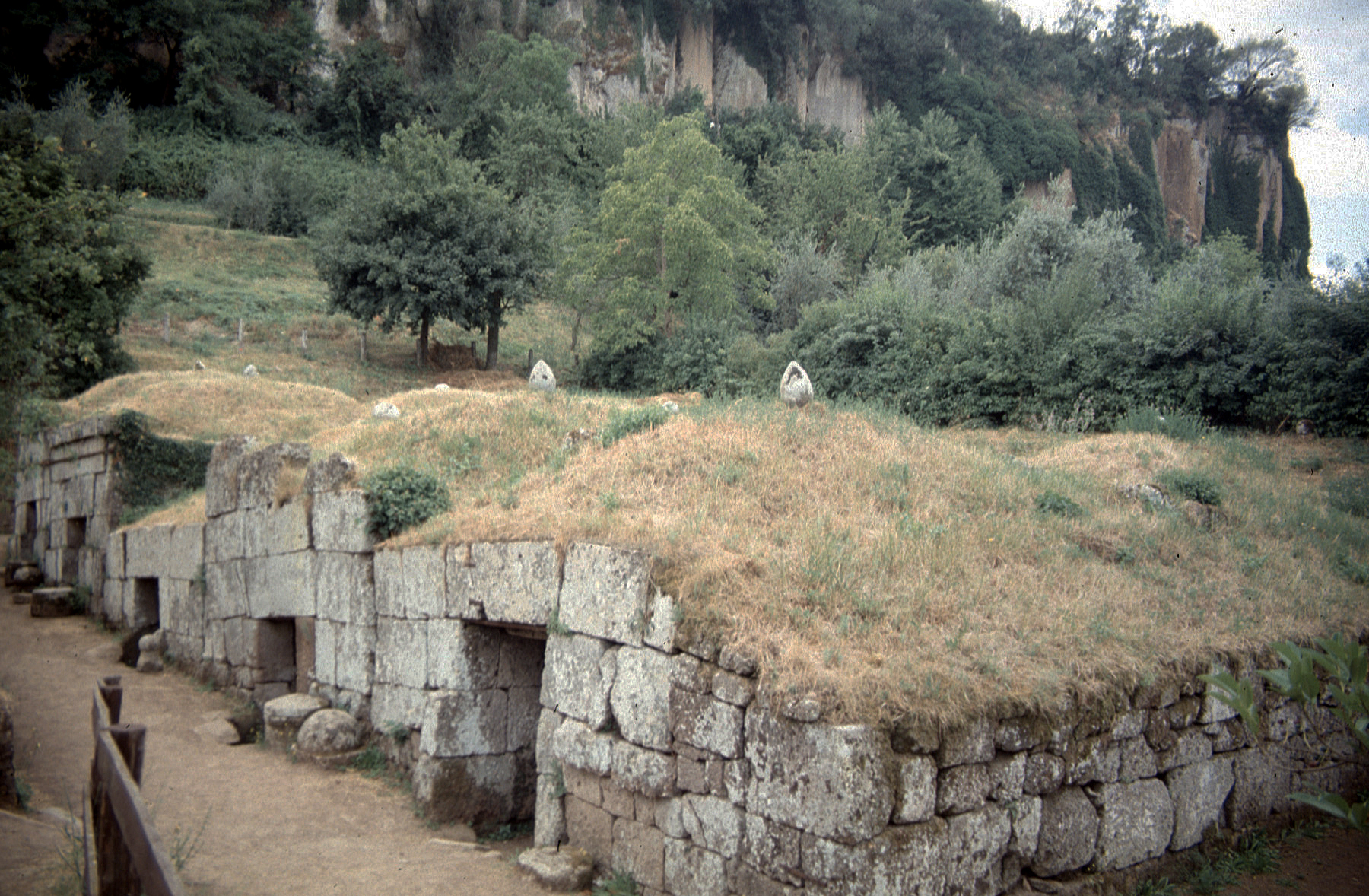
Etruscan Tombs at Orvieto

"The stone house --- suggests the Noah's Ark without the boat part: the Noah's Ark box we had as children, full of animals. And that is what it is, the Ark, the arc, the womb. The womb of all the world, that brought forth all creatures. The womb, the arc, where life retreats in the last refuge. The womb, the ark of the covenant, in which lies the mystery of eternal life, the manna and the mysteries. There it is standing displaced outside the doorway of Etruscan tombs at Cerveteri"

Further, when he visited the painted tombs of Tarquinia, he experienced some of the Etruscans' wonder at the mystery of the journey out of life and into death. He wrote:

"In the tombs we see it; (shows) throes of wonder and vivid feelings throbbing over death. Man moves naked and glowing through the universe. Then comes death: he dives into the sea; he departs into the underworld...the sea is that vast primordial creature that has a soul also, whose inwardness is womb of all things, out of which all things emerged, and into which they are devoured back…"

The poet Dylan Thomas also makes such a reference in his 18 Poems.

=== Anthropology ===
The name "womb tomb" has been given to tombs when considering the anthropology of much more recent burial sites. Stadler and Luz combine studies of the Christian tomb of St. Mary in Jerusalem and Muslim worship at Maqam Abu al-Hijja in Galilee. They concluded that the tombs' structure mimicked the human form. (See, below)

Their focus leads them to conclude that the politicisation of fertility by Christians and Muslims is demonstrated in both communities when examining the sites’ architecture and forms of veneration.

=== Scottish archaeological evidence ===
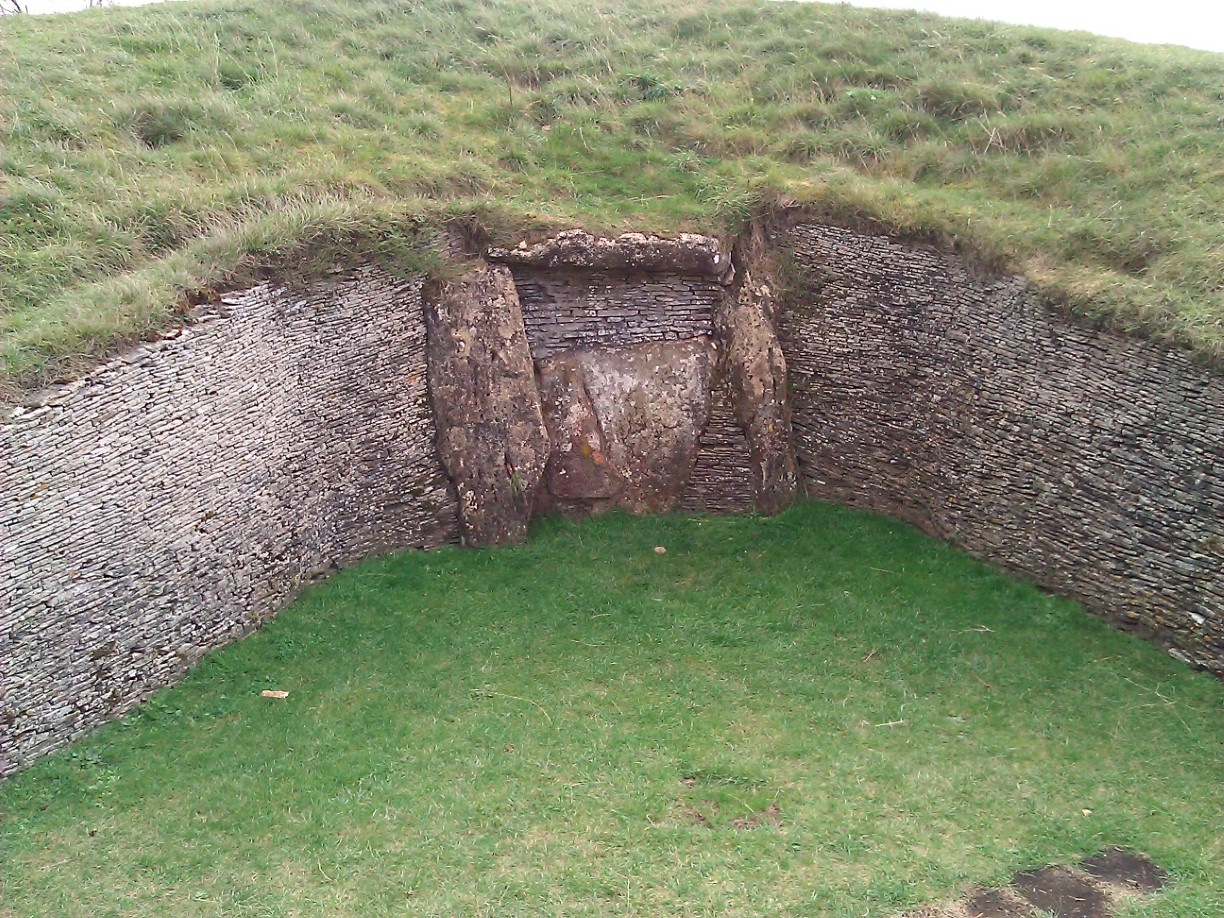
Belas Knap entrance in Gloucestershire, England

In Britain, passage graves of the West and North differ from the non-Megalithic long or round barrows of the East. The passage graves, usually with round mounds, have an essentially Atlantic coast distribution from Iberia to Orkney. The long grave is found across the north European plain, frequently beneath long mounds, and often of non-Megalithic construction. In a study of tombs across Scotland, Audrey Henshall identified features, such as portals, facades and horns supporting this idea. She suggests that burial rituals had been carried out both inside and outside the tombs, and that their focus was in many cases concerned with fertility and continuity rites.

Ken Baynes studied burials in Wales and England. About the chambered tomb at Belas Knap, Gloucestershire, he reported that the portal probably represented the vagina of the Earth Mother Goddess.

Examining Scottish neolithic burial sites Cochran concluded:

“...looking at how the tombs have been interpreted we have found that there is no inconsistency between the womb/tomb theory and any other interpretation...people themselves had built them over several generations, they knew what was inside, and they knew what they symbolised. It is impossible that they did not know about wombs, about vaginal passages, and about childbirth and its difficulties. And as early farmers they will have known about planting crops, reaping them, and replanting their seed-corn. They will have known about the fertility of their beasts, their land and of themselves, and they will have connected them all together and known how important they were. And because the idea was so important, and so simple, that is why they built the tombs in the shape of the womb. Placing the bodies of their dead back in the womb must have seemed completely logical...”

— H. Cochran

In Scotland, the term "womb tomb" almost always refers to chambered burial mounds. In this context it describes the general layout of the tomb, rather than describing a type of burial. It has also been used for specific pilgrimage sites for Christian as well as Muslim pilgrims.

== Womb Tombs and the Saints ==
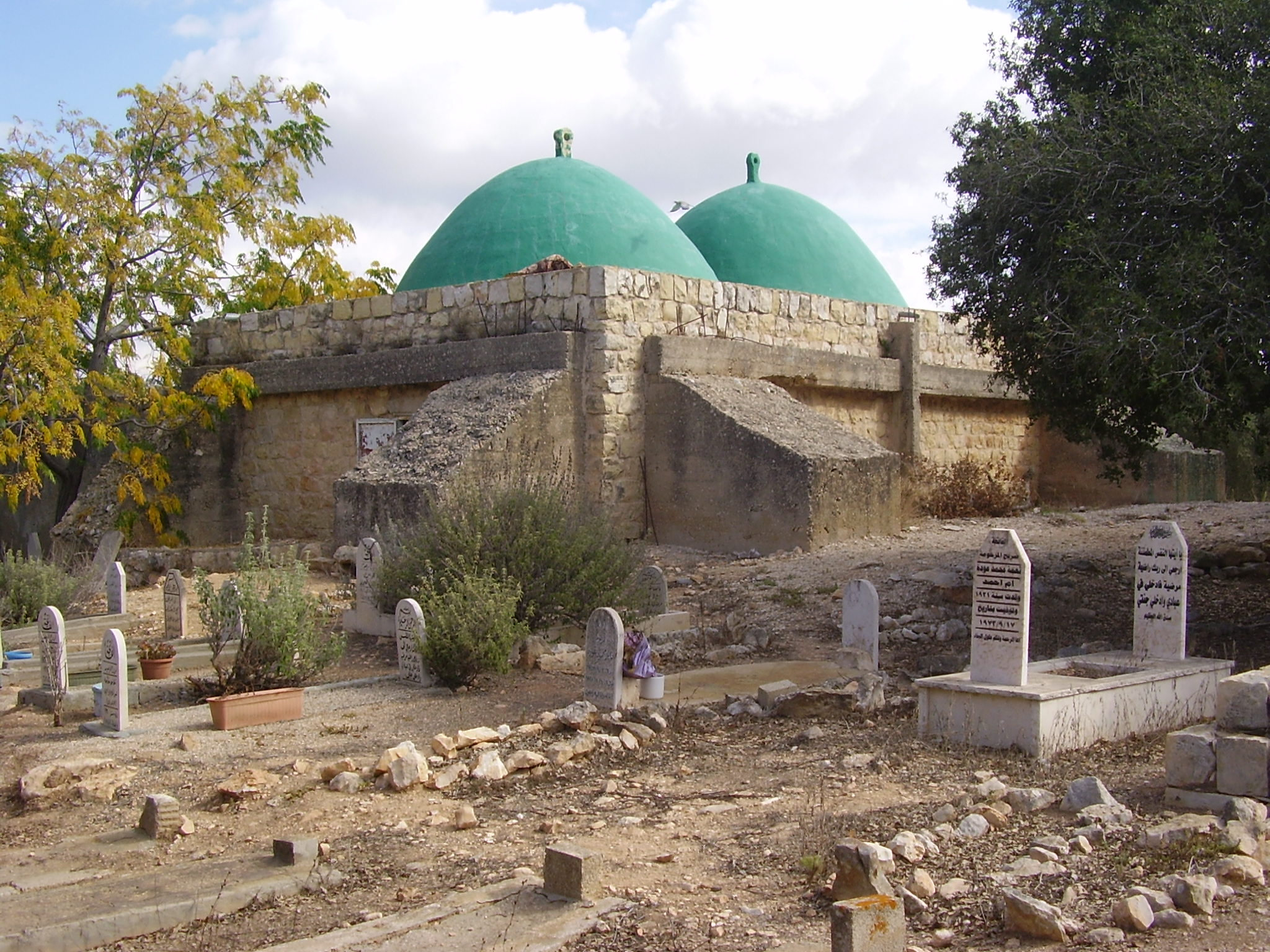
Tomb of Abu al-Hija

In a 2014 research paper, Stadler & Nurit make use of the term “womb-tomb” to describe the tomb of Mary and Maqam Abu al-Hija. Stadler and Nurit state:

…we define womb-tom shrines as enclosed, dimly lit, and, by and large, cavelike structures that house the tomb of a venerated figure. Moreover, they are characterized by small and uncommonly low entrances that force visitors to bend down and at times brush up against either or both sides of the door...

Stadler and Nurit see both sites as reminiscent of human anatomy in this way. In addition, they explore the ways in which these physical characteristics lend symbolic significance to the tombs' simultaneous functions as places of intercessory prayer in personal matters and demonstrations of minority group indigeneity:

...we contend that by dint of their ancient physical structure, womb-tomb venues constitute a place for seeking preternatural interventions for sickness, infertility, pain, and other hardships. At the same time, these sites are minority outlets for voicing indigenous claims to the land and reinforcing a sense of group and individual belonging… In other words, visits to these enclosed, dark venues express minority groups' inherence to the site, the region, and its soil.

This work has similar roots across different faiths and resonates with that of Marija Gimbutas (above). In Mesoamerican cosmology, the planet was generally deemed to be a female (Milbrath 1988:159-60, 1997), so that caves were closely associated with the Mother Earth/fertility goddess complex.

== See also ==
- Belas Knap
- Court cairn
- Chamber tomb
- Kaukab Abu al-Hija
