= Fraubillen cross =

Sculpted menhir in Germany

- de: Fraubillenkreuz
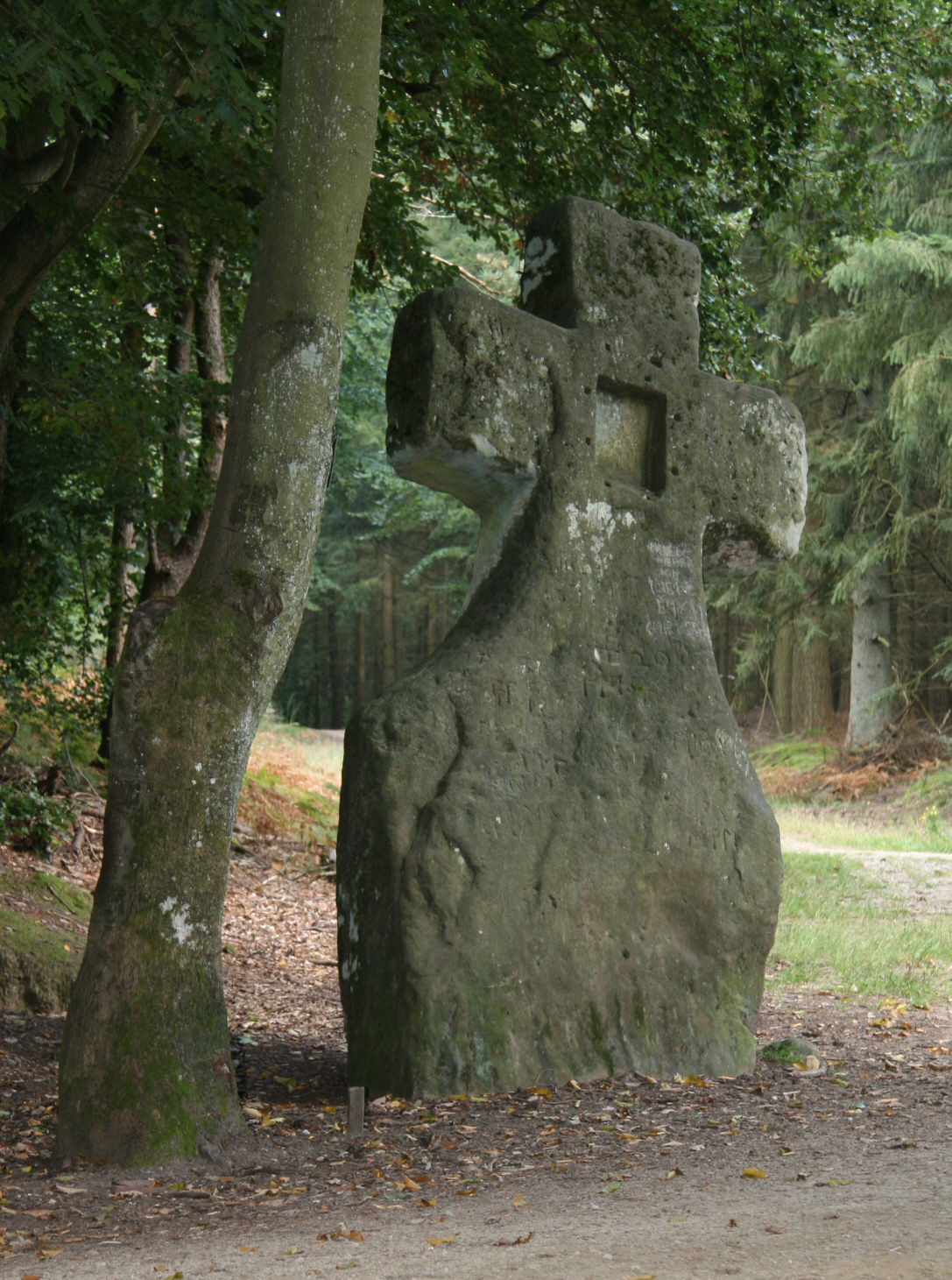
- The Fraubillen cross
- Artist: Willibrord
- Subject: Cross
- Dimensions: 3.5 m (11 ft)
- 49°52′27″N 6°22′15″E

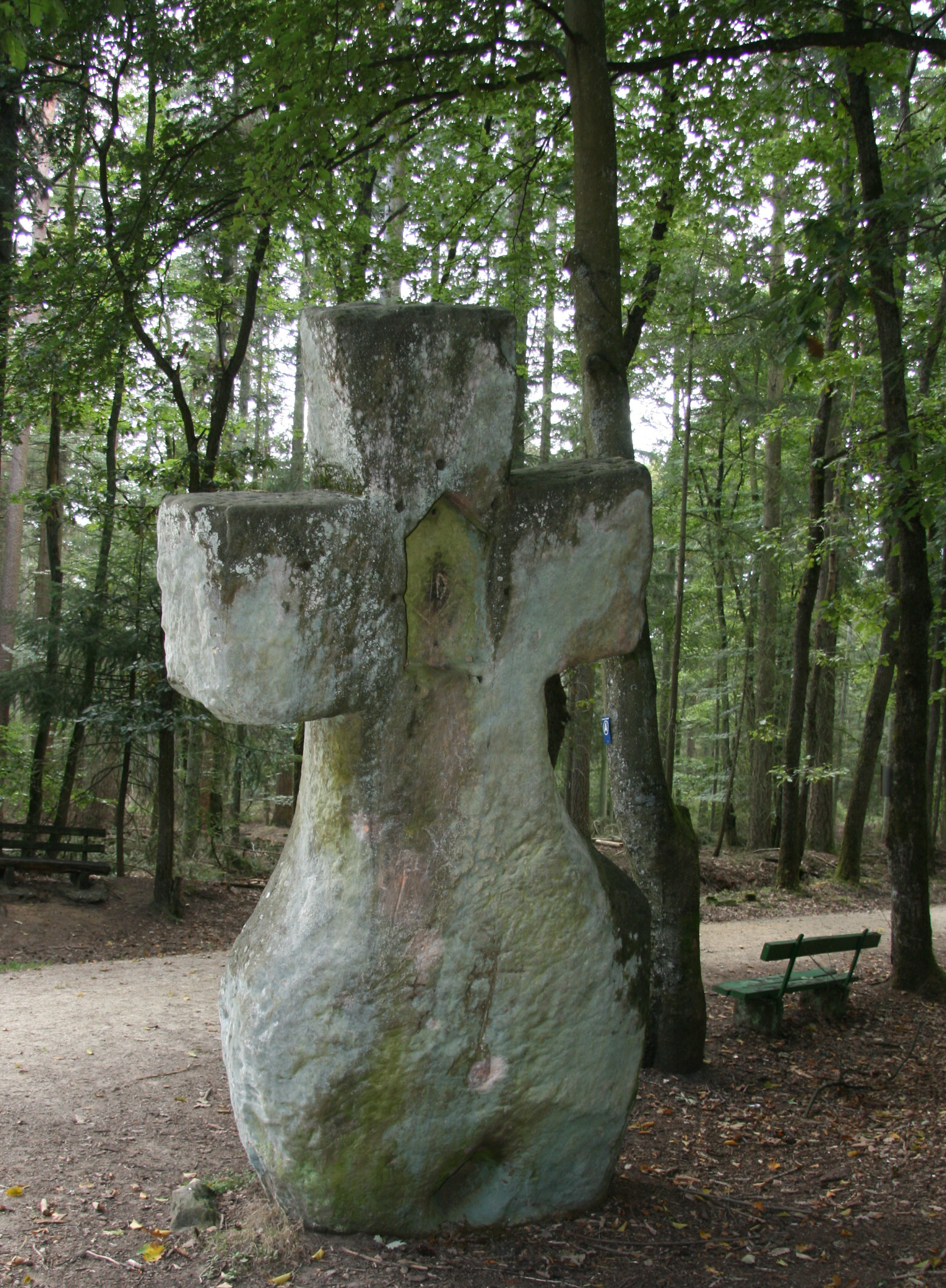
Rear view of the Fraubillen cross

The Fraubillen cross (German: Fraubillenkreuz) is a menhir, which has been resculpted into a cross. It stands by a wayside on the Ferschweiler Plateau in the Eifel mountains in Germany, between Ferschweiler, Schankweiler, Nusbaum-Rohrbach and Bollendorf.

According to tradition, the celebrated missionary in the Eifel region, Willibrord refashioned the roughly 5,000-year-old menhir by hand into the shape of a cross as a Christian monument. Two niches for figures have been chiselled into the rock, each surrounded by holes. Today, the cross is about 3.5 metres high.

The origin of its name is unclear. It could be derived from Unserer lieben Frau Bild-Kreuz, "Sculpted Cross of Our Dear Lady". Another possibility is that the name is derived from Sibyl, which was given to prophetic women. Evidence of the latter is that the menhir was mentioned in 1617 as the Sybillen Creutz ("Sybil Cross"). The church historian Rainer Neu writes in his book „Willibrord“: The signification of that name lies on hand if interpreted from Dutch or from the dialect of the Rhineland. Here „Billen“ or „Bollen“ design buttocks, so „Fraubillenkreuz“ means exactly what is visible: a „Woman-buttocks-cross“. (page 134)

== Literature ==
- Johannes Groht: Menhire in Deutschland. Landesamt für Denkmalpflege und Archäologie Sachsen-Anhalt, Halle (Saale) 2013, ISBN 978-3-943904-18-5, pp. 339–340.
- Leonard Palzkill: Sauertal ohne Grenzen. Wanderungen durch die deutsch-luxemburgische Felsenlandschaft. Verbandsgemeinde Irrel, Irrel, 2002, ISBN 3-00-008585-8, p. 41: "Fraubillenkreuz".
- Walter Pipke, Ida Leinberger: Die Eifel. Geschichte und Kultur des alten Vulkanlandes zwischen Aachen und Trier. 5th updated edition. DuMont, Cologne, 2006, ISBN 3-7701-3926-7 (DuMont Kunstreiseführer).
- Pierre Kauthen: Vom 'Fraubillenkreuz' zum Grab des hl. Willibrord. In: Hémecht 2011 (63rd year), Issue 1, pp.5-20.
