= Devil's Gorge (Eifel) =

Valley in Germany

Coordinates: 49°50′44″N 6°26′27″E

The Devil's Gorge or Teufelsschlucht is located on the eastern edge of the Ferschweiler Plateau within the South Eifel Nature Park in the vicinity of Irrel.

It was formed towards the end of the last ice age, about 10,000 years ago as the result of one or more rock collapses.

The cause of this event was probably a combination of the geological and climatic circumstances. The heavily fissured, more or less porous, rock strata of the so-called Luxembourg Sandstone (geologically part of the Lower Jurassic or German Lias) are laid over keuper beds that tend towards being impervious. As weathering progresses, the structure becomes unstable as a result of the undercutting of the sandstone base. Towards the end of the last glaciation period this undercutting, in combination with extensive frost shattering, reached the point where it caused the aforementioned rock collapse.

Today numerous boulders on the slopes of the Ferschweiler Plateau bear witness to the major rock displacements of this period. The Devil's Gorge is a rock fissure between about 1 and 5 metres wide and is a direct consequence of the rock collapse.

Because of its landscape, steep rock faces, narrow gorges and fissures, the Devil's Gorge is a popular attraction for tourists and the start point for other walks in the vicinity.

== Gallery ==
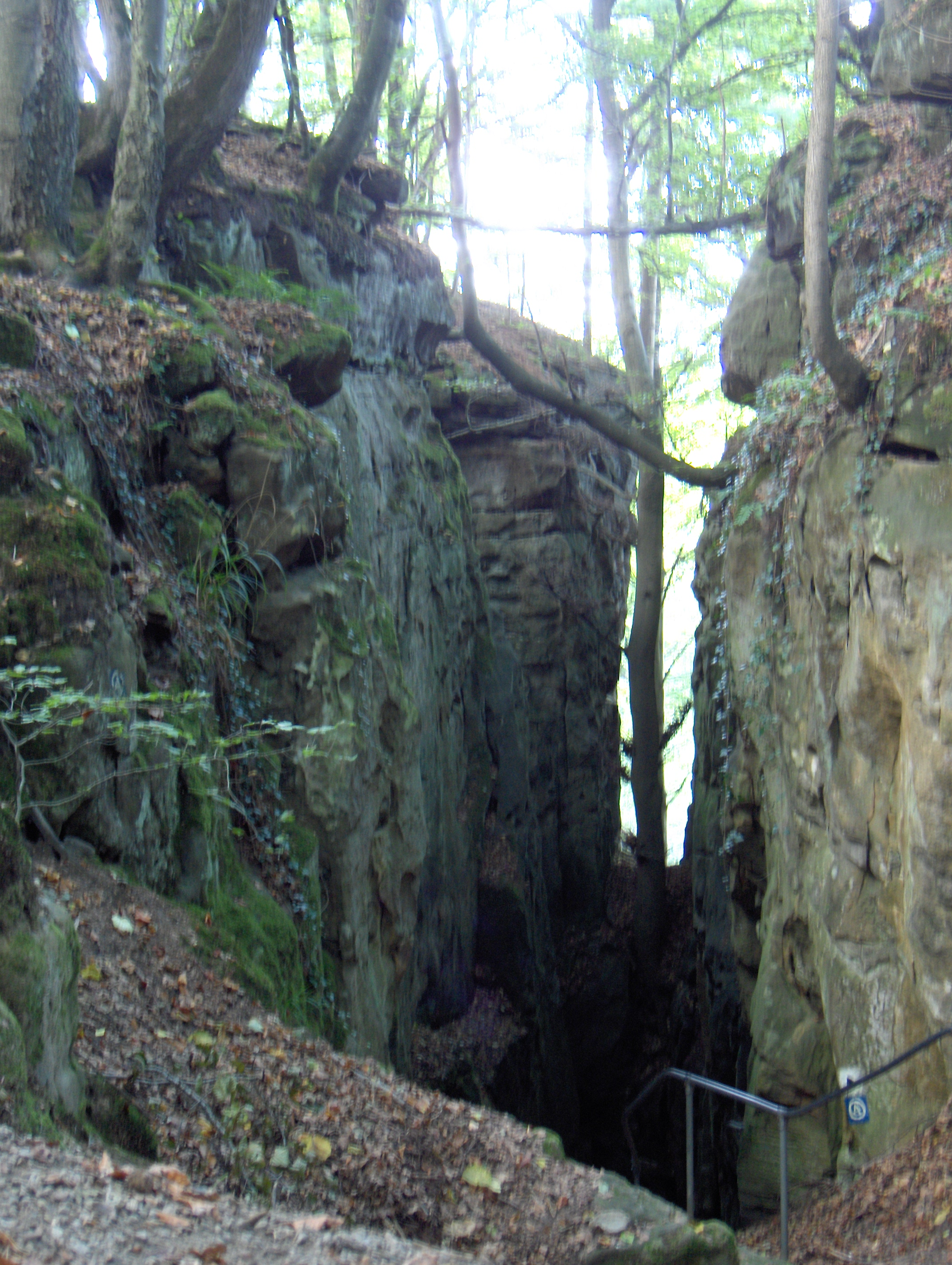
Entrance to the gorge

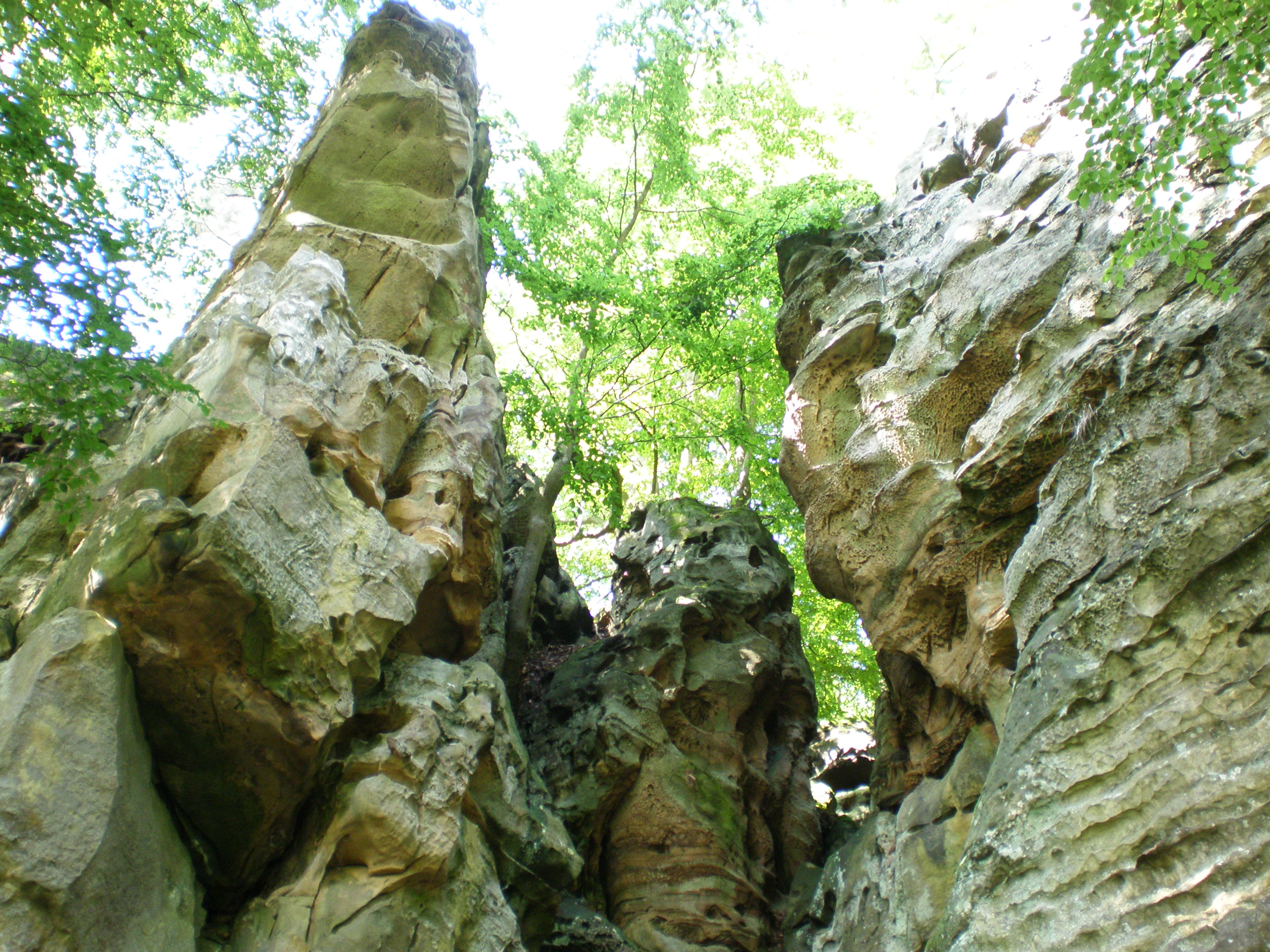
Typical rock formations in the gorge

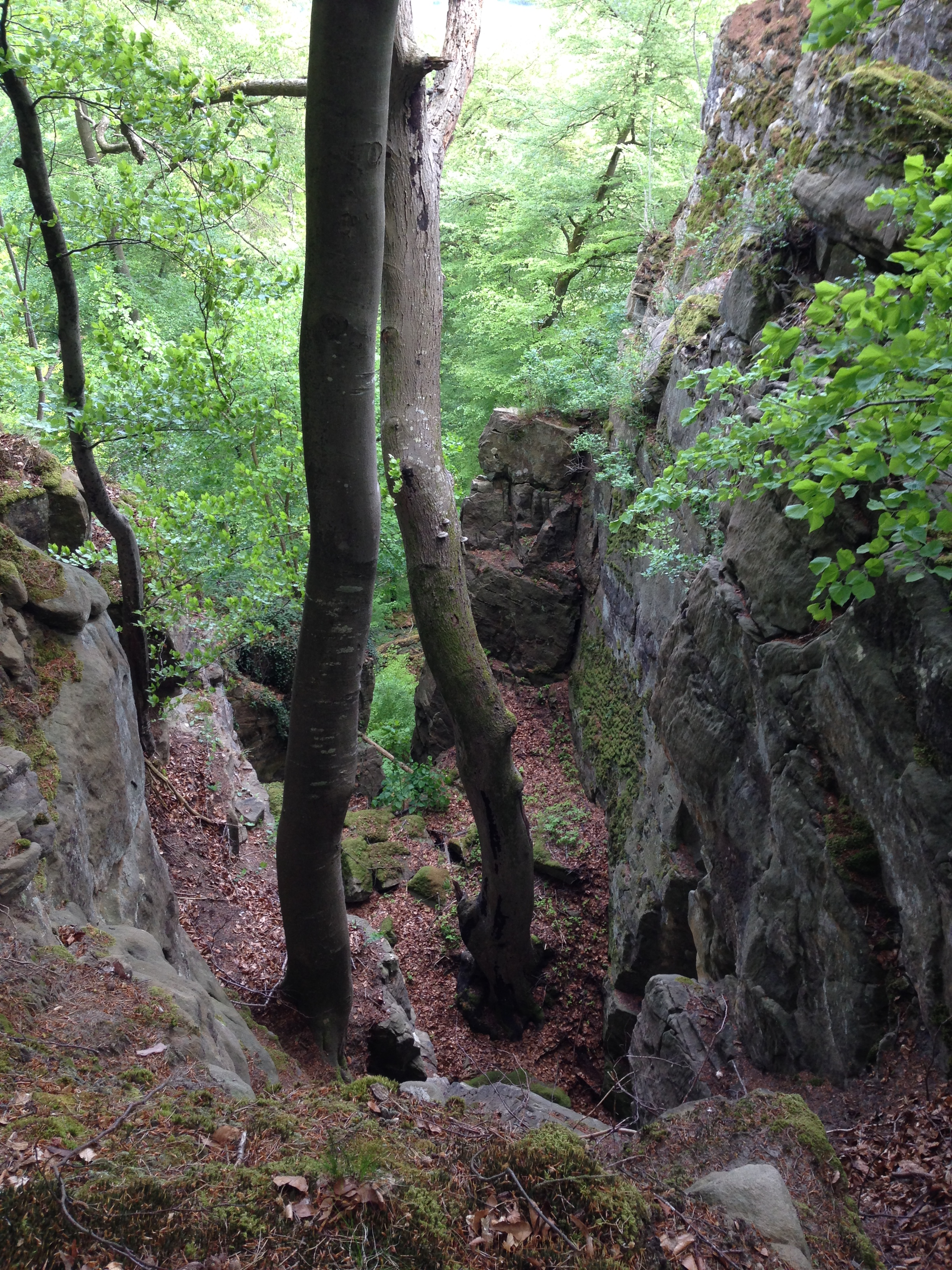
Entry to the gorge section
