= Hommerdingen =

- Municipality
- Location of Hommerdingen within Eifelkreis Bitburg-Prüm district
- Interactive map of Hommerdingen
- Location within Germany Location within Rhineland-Palatinate
- Coordinates: 49°54′33″N 6°19′15″E
- Country: Germany
- State: Rhineland-Palatinate
- District: Eifelkreis Bitburg-Prüm
- Municipal assoc.: Südeifel

Government
  - Mayor (2019–24): Michael Pelletier sen.

Area
  - Total: 2.04 km^{2} (0.79 sq mi)
- Elevation: 364 m (1,194 ft)

Population (2025-12-31)
  - Total: 94
  - Density: 46/km^{2} (120/sq mi)
- Time zone: UTC+01:00 (CET)
  - Summer (DST): UTC+02:00 (CEST)
- Postal codes: 54675
- Dialling codes: 06522
- Vehicle registration: BIT
- Website: Hommerdingen at site www.suedeifelinfo.de

Hommerdingen is a municipality in the district of Bitburg-Prüm, in Rhineland-Palatinate, western Germany.

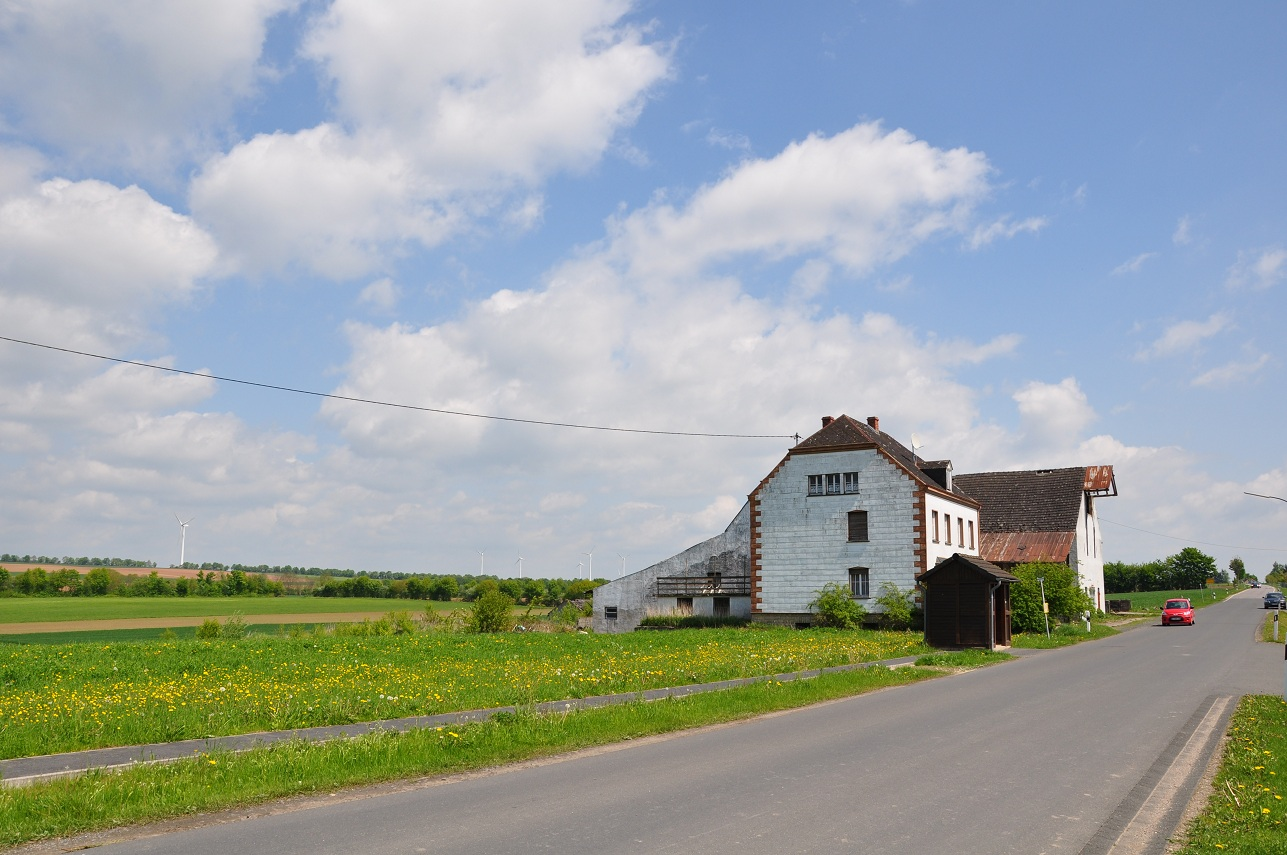
The road to Nusbaum in Hommerdingen
