= Nusbaum =

- Municipality
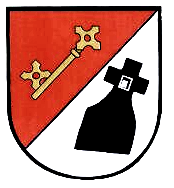
- Coat of arms

- Location of Nusbaum within Eifelkreis Bitburg-Prüm district
- Interactive map of Nusbaum
- Location within Germany Location within Rhineland-Palatinate
- Coordinates: 49°54′58″N 6°20′38″E
- Country: Germany
- State: Rhineland-Palatinate
- District: Eifelkreis Bitburg-Prüm
- Municipal assoc.: Südeifel

Government
  - Mayor (2019–24): Johann Hoff

Area
  - Total: 17.16 km^{2} (6.63 sq mi)
- Elevation: 350 m (1,150 ft)

Population (2025-12-31)
  - Total: 428
  - Density: 24.9/km^{2} (64.6/sq mi)
- Time zone: UTC+01:00 (CET)
  - Summer (DST): UTC+02:00 (CEST)
- Postal codes: 54675
- Dialling codes: 06522
- Vehicle registration: BIT
- Website: Nusbaum at site www.suedeifelinfo.de

Nusbaum is a municipality in the district Bitburg-Prüm in Rhineland-Palatinate, Germany, situated in the southern part of the Eifel.

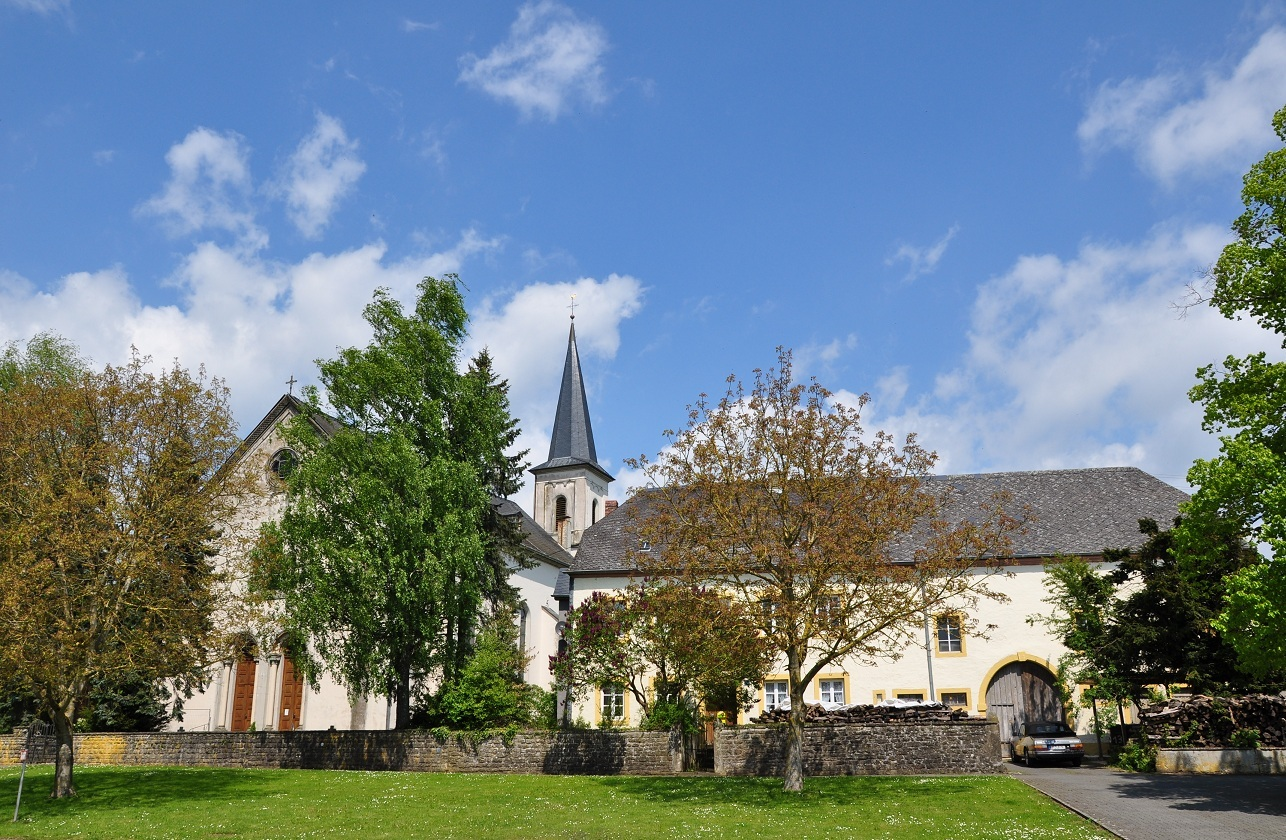
Church, Nusbaum

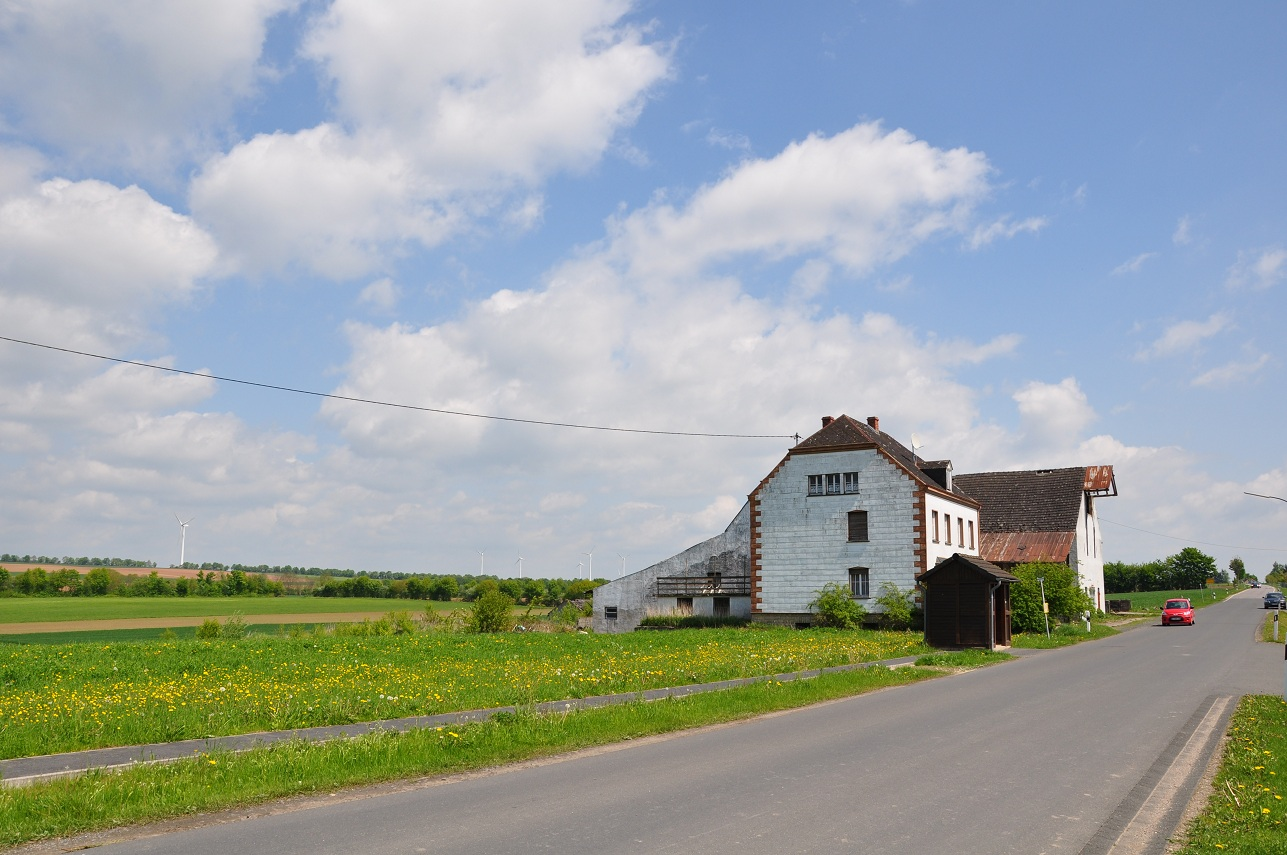
Road from Hommerdingen to Nusbaum
