= Belas Knap =

Long barrow

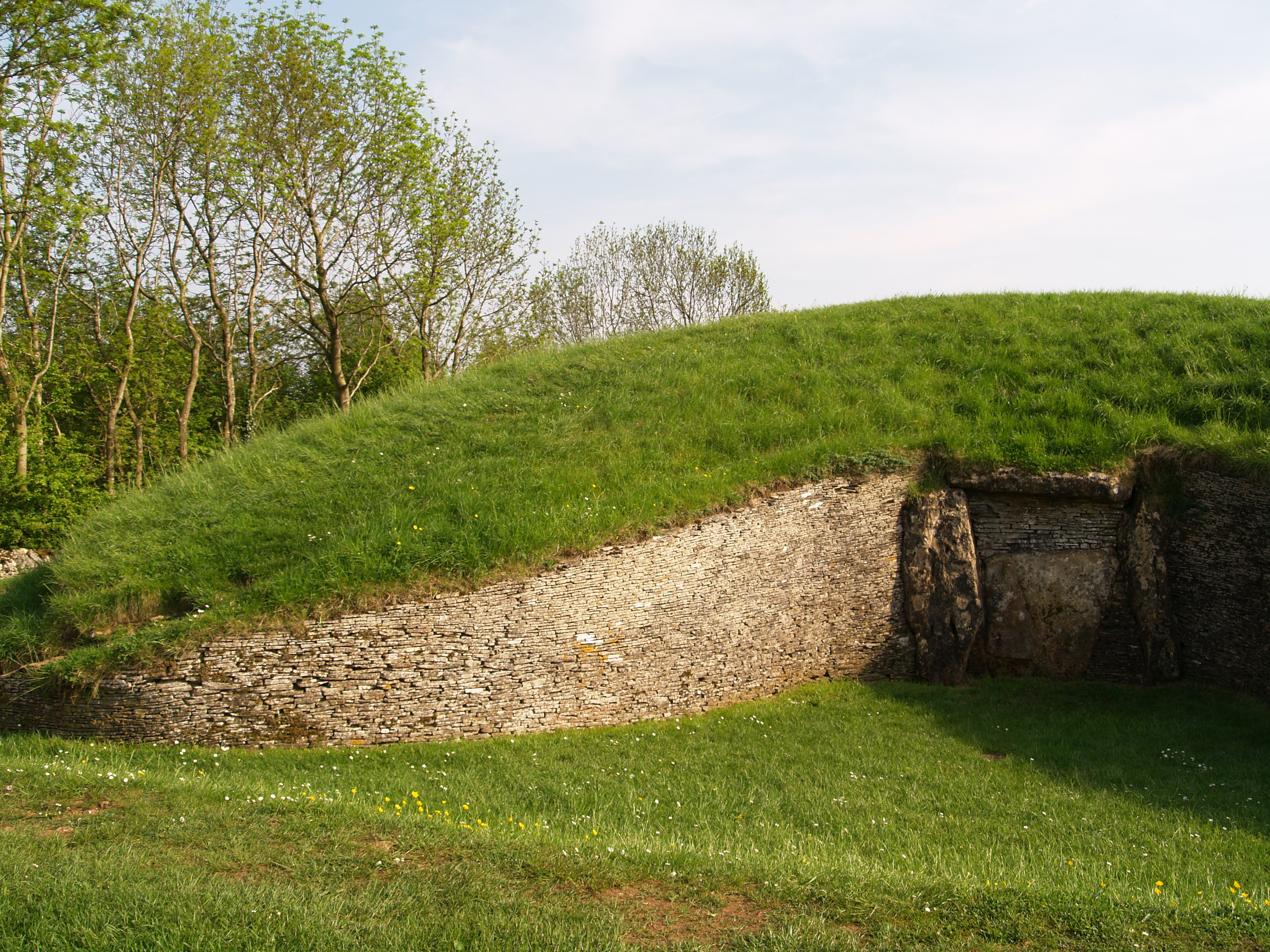
- The northern end of the site, showing the intricate false entrance

- Location in England, United Kingdom
- 51°55′38″N 1°58′15″W
- Type: Chambered long barrow
- Periods: Neolithic
- Location: Winchcombe, England, United Kingdom
- Part of: Severn-Cotswold tombs

History
- Built: c. 3000 BC
- Abandoned: c. 2000 BC

Site notes
- Material: Stone
- Height: c. 4.3 m (14 ft)
- Length: c. 54 m (177 ft)
- Width: c. 18 m (59 ft)
- Excavation dates: 1863-1865, 1928-1931
- Owner: English Heritage
- Management: Gloucestershire County Council
- Website: www.english-heritage.org.uk/visit/places/belas-knap-long-barrow/

Scheduled monument
- Official name: Belas Knap
- Designated: 30 August 1922
- Reference no.: 1008199

Belas Knap is a Neolithic, chambered long barrow situated on Cleeve Hill, near Cheltenham and Winchcombe, in Gloucestershire, England.

It is a type of monument known as the Cotswold Severn Cairn, all of which have a similar trapezoid shape, and are found scattered along the River Severn. Belas Knap is described in the English Heritage designation listing statement as an "outstanding example representing a group of long barrows commonly referred to as the Cotswold-Severn group".

== History and purpose ==
Construction is estimated to have taken place around 3000 BC, with following successive burials over a period of years and then the burial chambers were deliberately blocked.

== Dimensions ==
The barrow is about 178 feet (54 m) long, about 60 feet (18 m) wide and nearly 14 feet (4.3 m) in height.

== Description ==
=== False entrance ===
What appears to be the main entrance to the barrow, with intricate dry-stone walling and large limestone jambs and lintels is, in fact, a false one. This may have been to deter robbers, although little in the way of value has been found in undisturbed tomb chambers. Alternatively, it could have been a ‘spirit door’, intended to allow the dead to come and go and partake of offerings brought to the tomb by their descendants.

=== Burial chambers ===
The actual burial chambers are down the long East and West sides of the barrow and at its Southern foot. There are four burial chambers, two on opposite sides near the middle, one at the South-East angle and one at the South end. These are formed of upright stone slabs, linked by dry-stone walling and originally had corbelled roofs.

== Excavation ==
In the 1863-1865 excavations, the skeletal remains of five children, aged between 6 months and 8 years, the skull of a young adult male, horse and pig bones and fragments of pottery and serrated flint blade were found among the rubble blocking the 'false entrance'. The passages leading to the chambers were roughly blocked with stones and clay. The lintels and much of the dry walling were rebuilt on the original lines in 1863-1865, when the barrow was first explored. After the 1928-1931 work, the walling was secured, three of the chambers were covered and the contour of the mound was restored. Excavations in 1963 found the remains of 38 human skeletons, together with animal bones, flint implements and pottery of the end of the Neolithic period (New Stone Age), around 2000 BC. These burials, however, occurred over a long period of time and it may be that none date to the time when the mound was built.

== Access ==
It is accessed by either of two paths. The best known is the one from the narrow and steep Charlton Abbots road, south of Winchcombe. There is a 'pull-in' on the left, with a signpost pointing up through the trees to the right. There is a steep climb for the first stretch of the footpath, affording views of Winchcombe, until the rounded hill top is reached. This walk takes approximately 10 minutes. The other is from the 'no through road', which leaves the above road at SP 019263, to go up to Corndean Hall. The last part of the drive is on an unsurfaced track, on which vehicular access is not possible. This cuts out the steep climb of the other route and approaches the site from the West.

== Location ==
The mound is situated at Ordnance Survey six-figure grid reference SP 021 254. It is just below the summit.

== Gallery ==
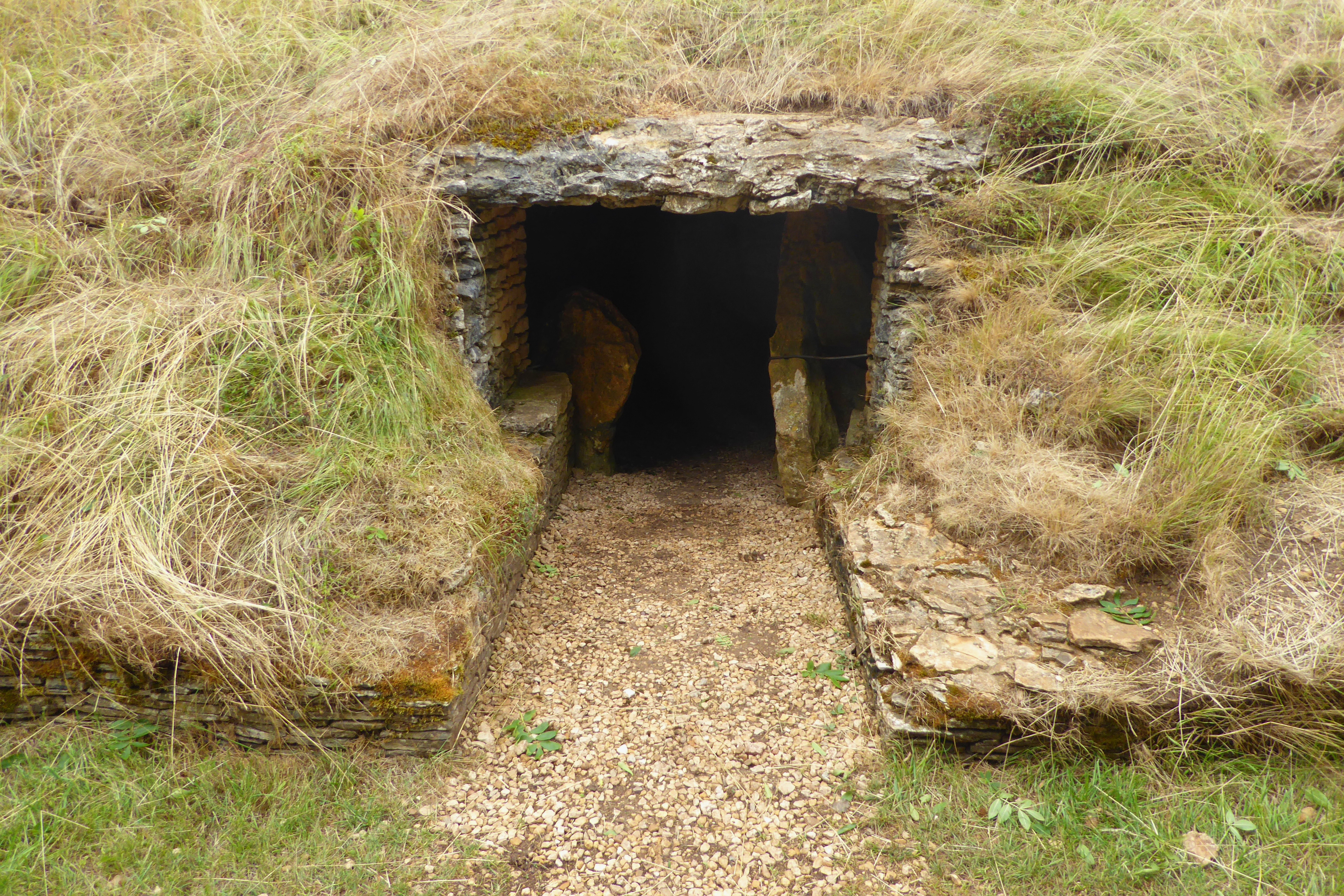
Chamber C

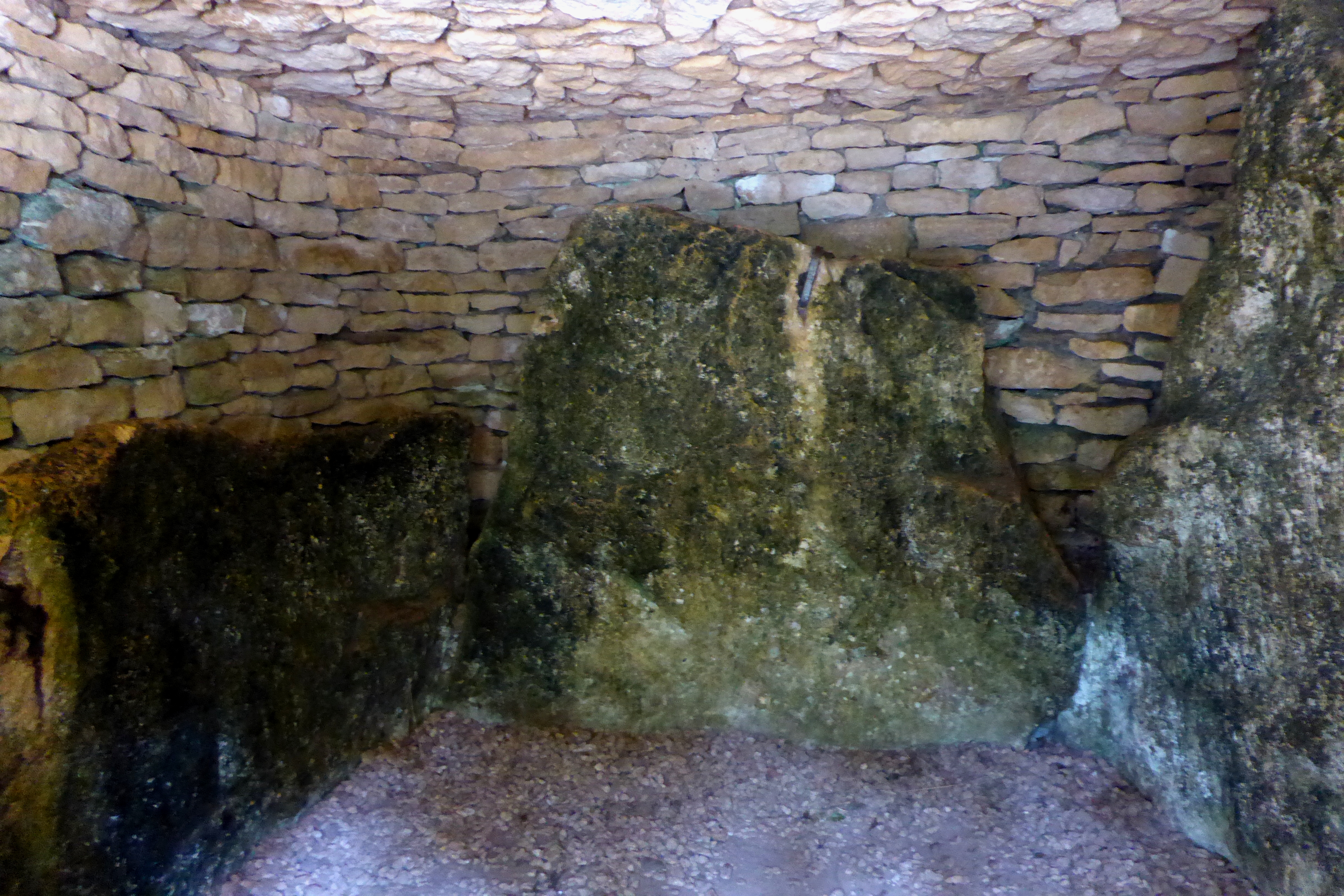
Interior of Chamber C

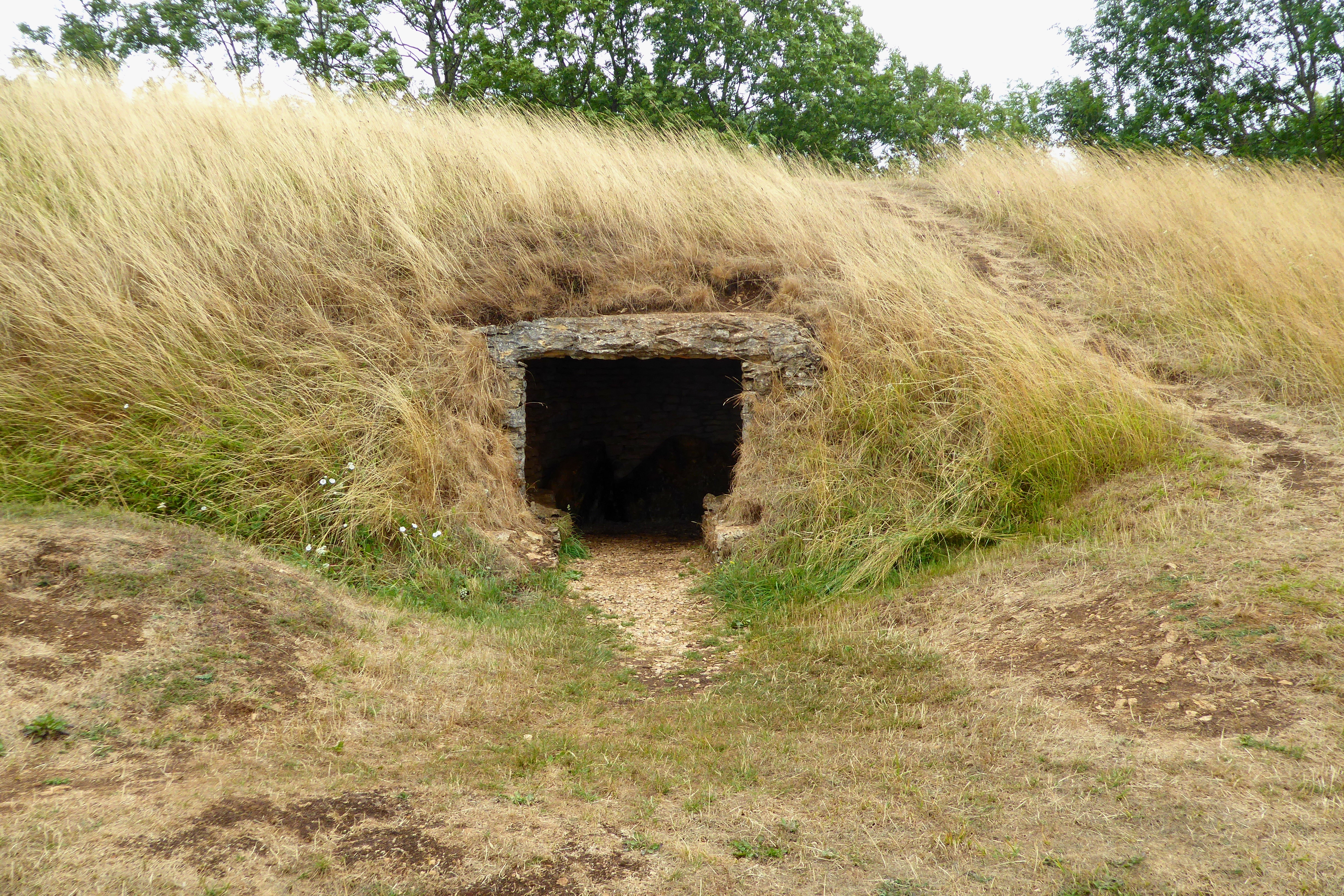
Chamber D

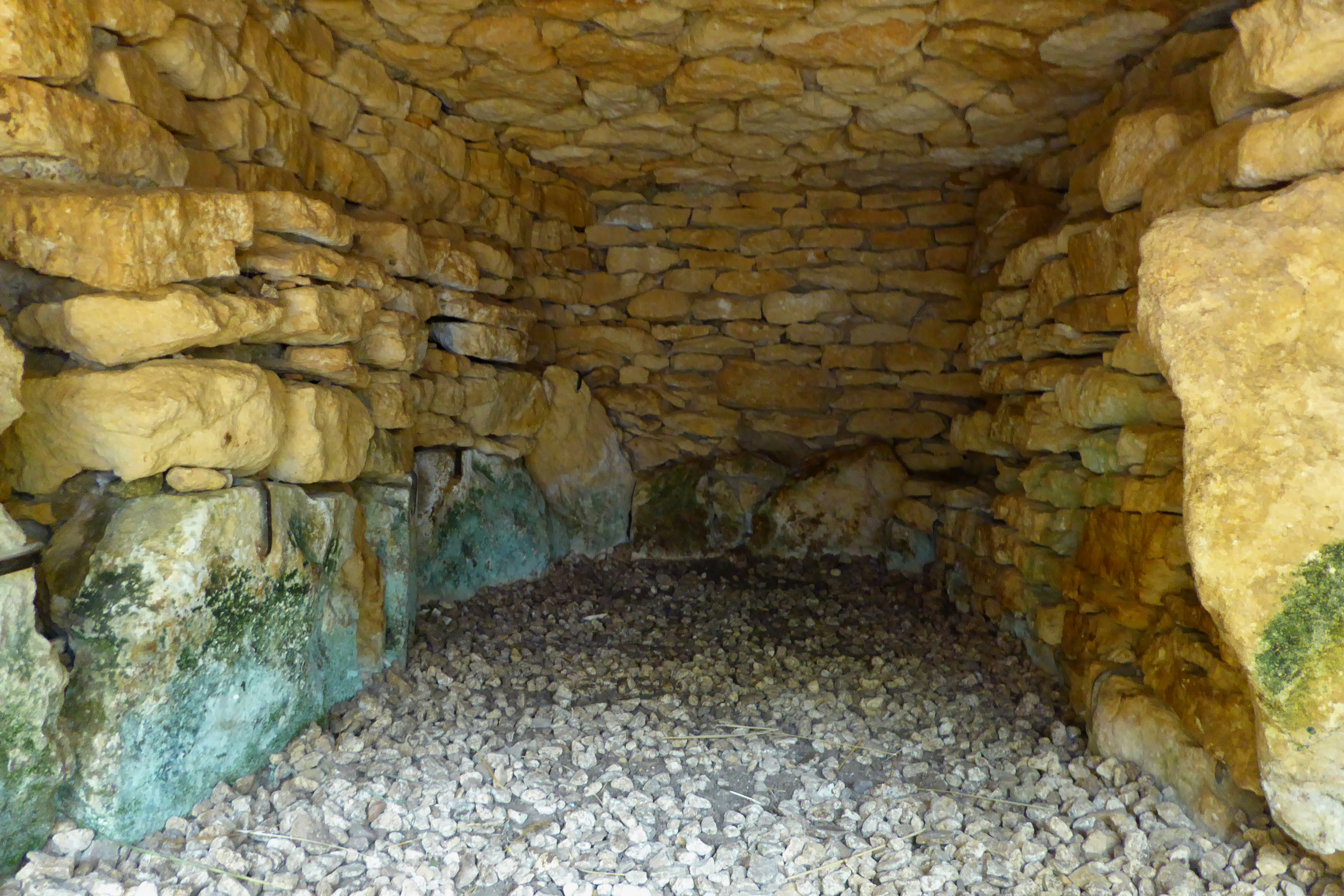
Interior of Chamber B

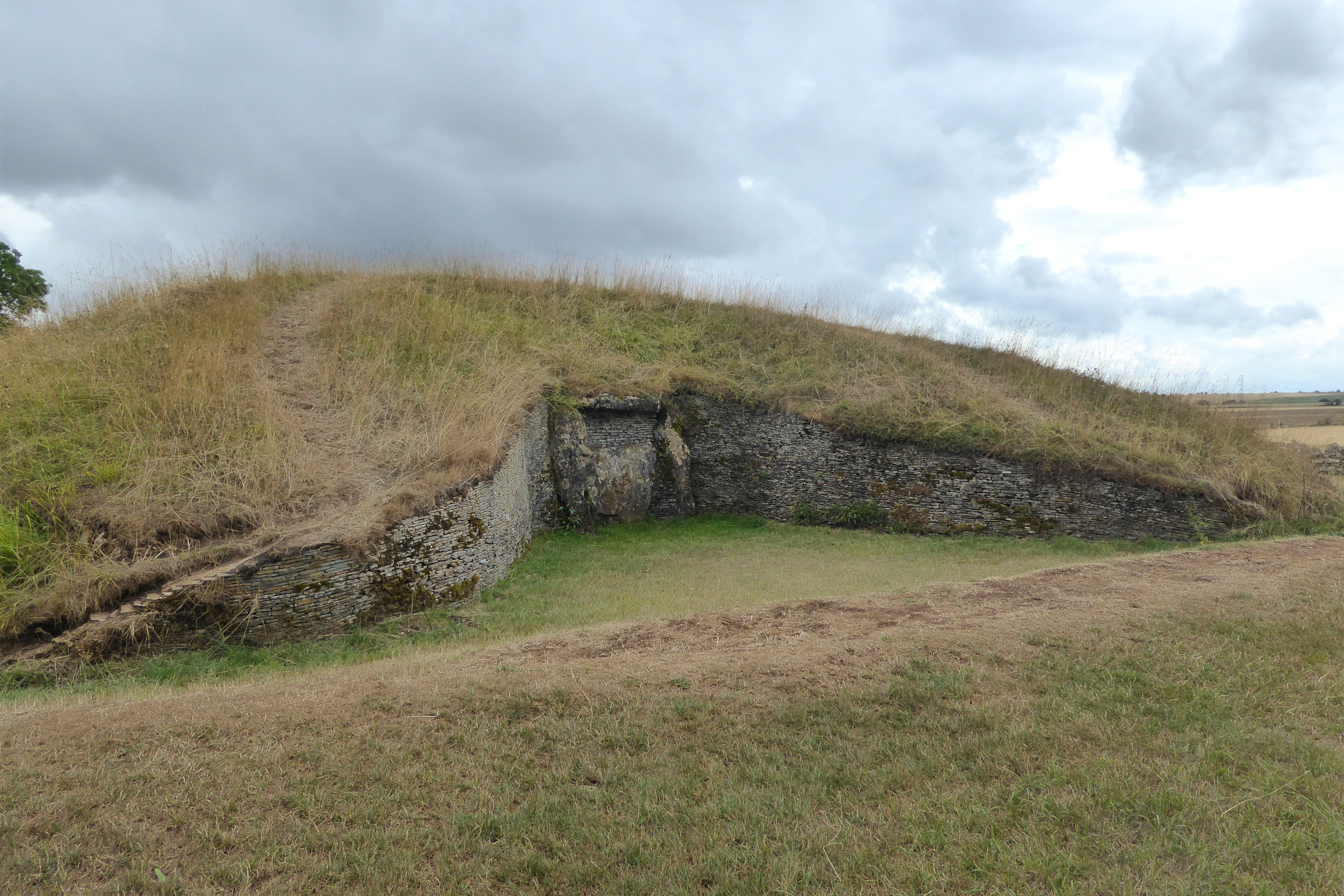
False Portal Entrance
