= Mane Braz =

Dolmens in Erdeven, France

Coordinates: 47°38′2.76″N 3°7′53.46″W

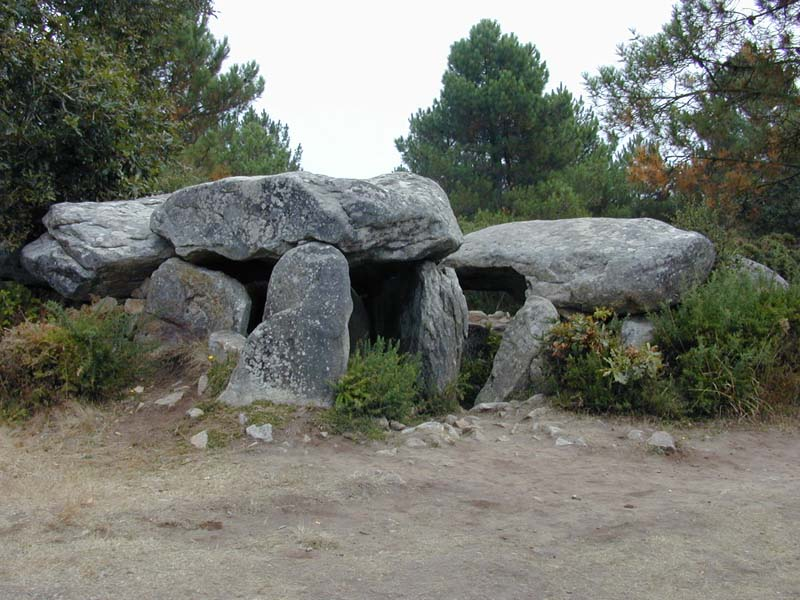
The Megalithic tomb in Mane Braz, Brittany

Mane Braz is a Megalithic tomb located 2 km southeast of Erdeven, Brittany, France. The site comprises four side chambers and two small dolmens. It is built into a hill and appears to be the remains of a tumulus. Along with other nearby sites like the Saint-Michel tumulus, it forms a lithic alignment group which may have been intentionally linked during the later Neolithic.
