= Druidenstein =

Rock formation in Germany

Coordinates: 50°47′41.56″N 7°54′36.82″E

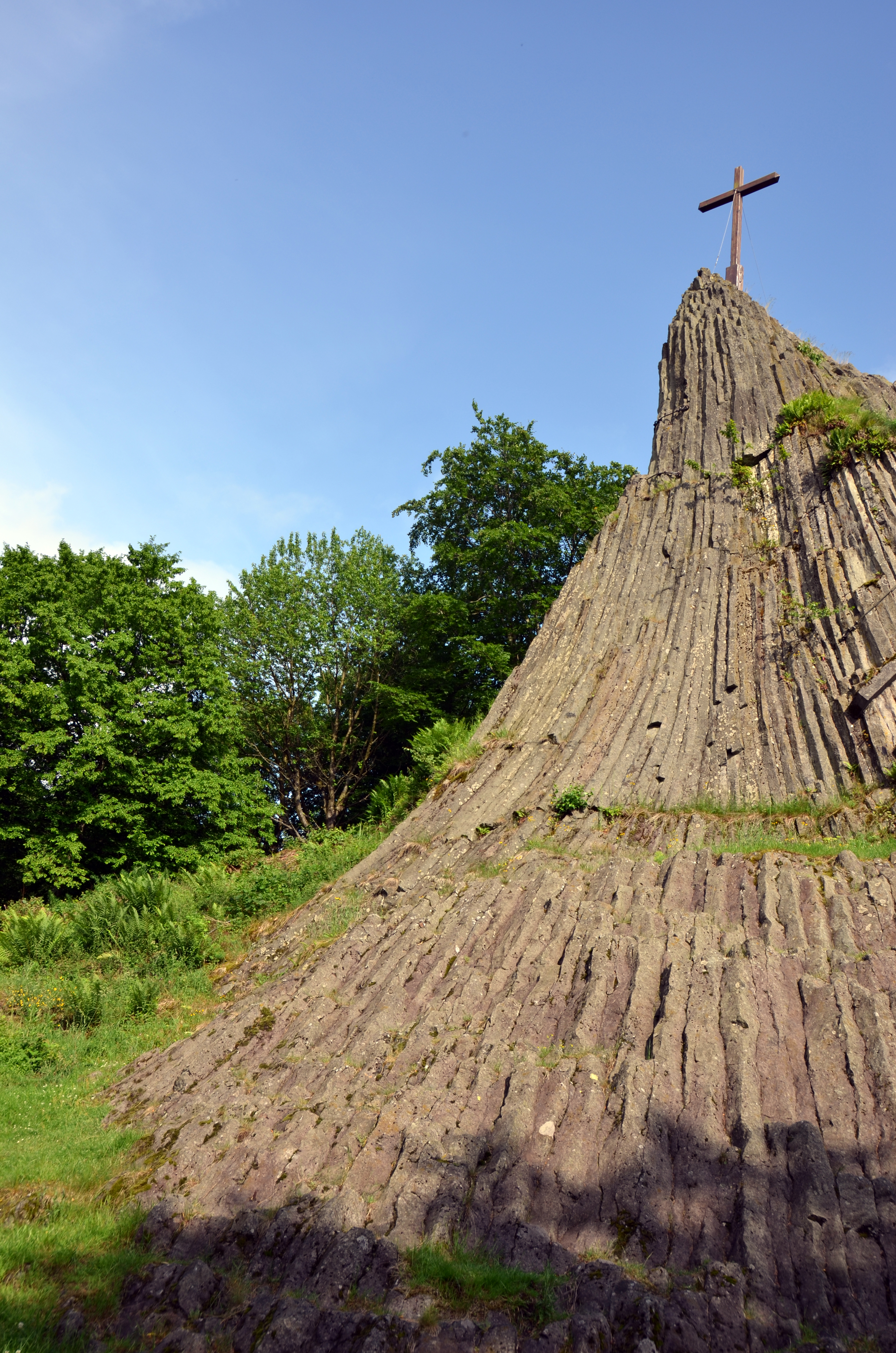
Druidenstein national geotope

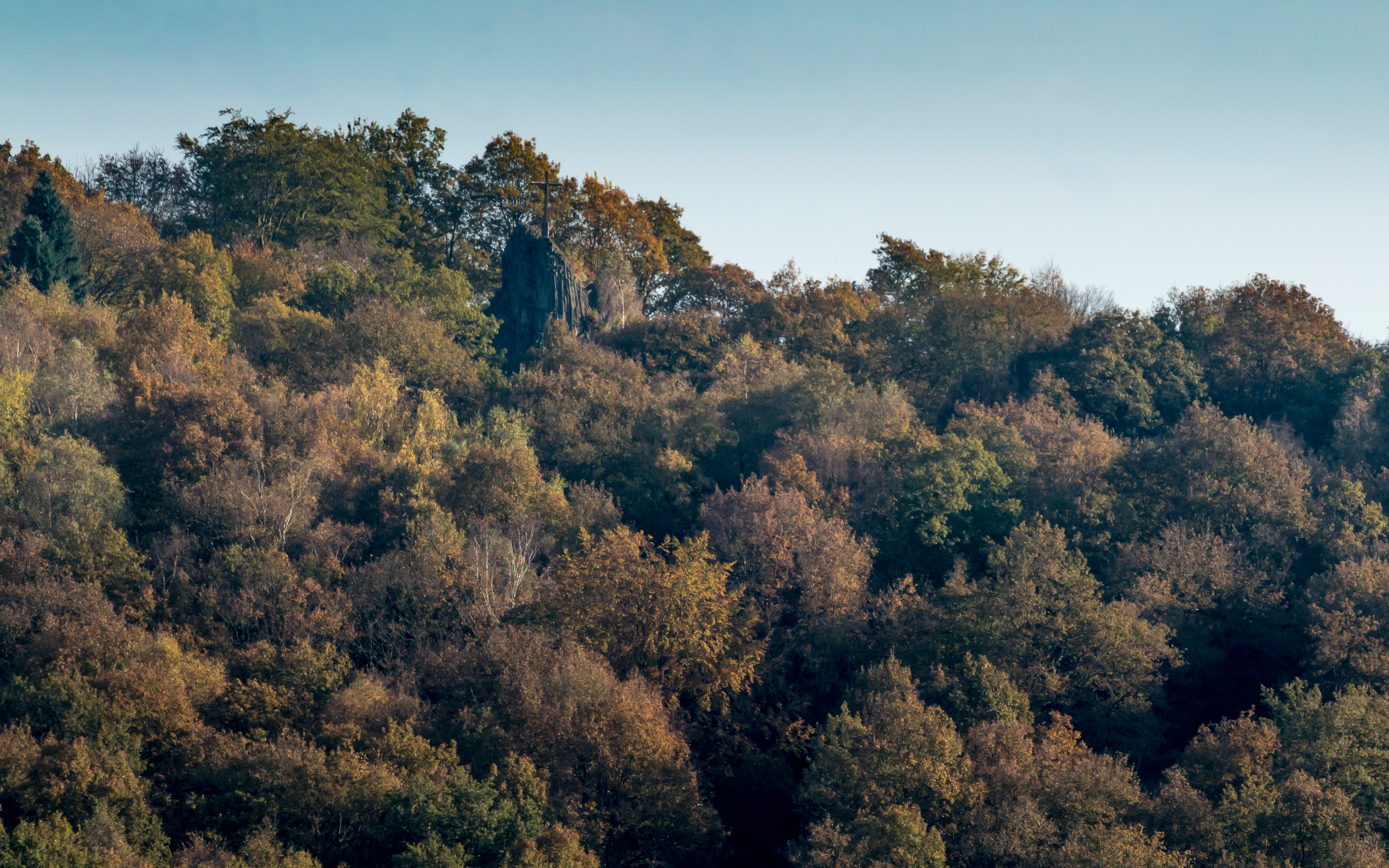
The top of the Druidenstein above the tips of the trees (seen from the Otto Tower)

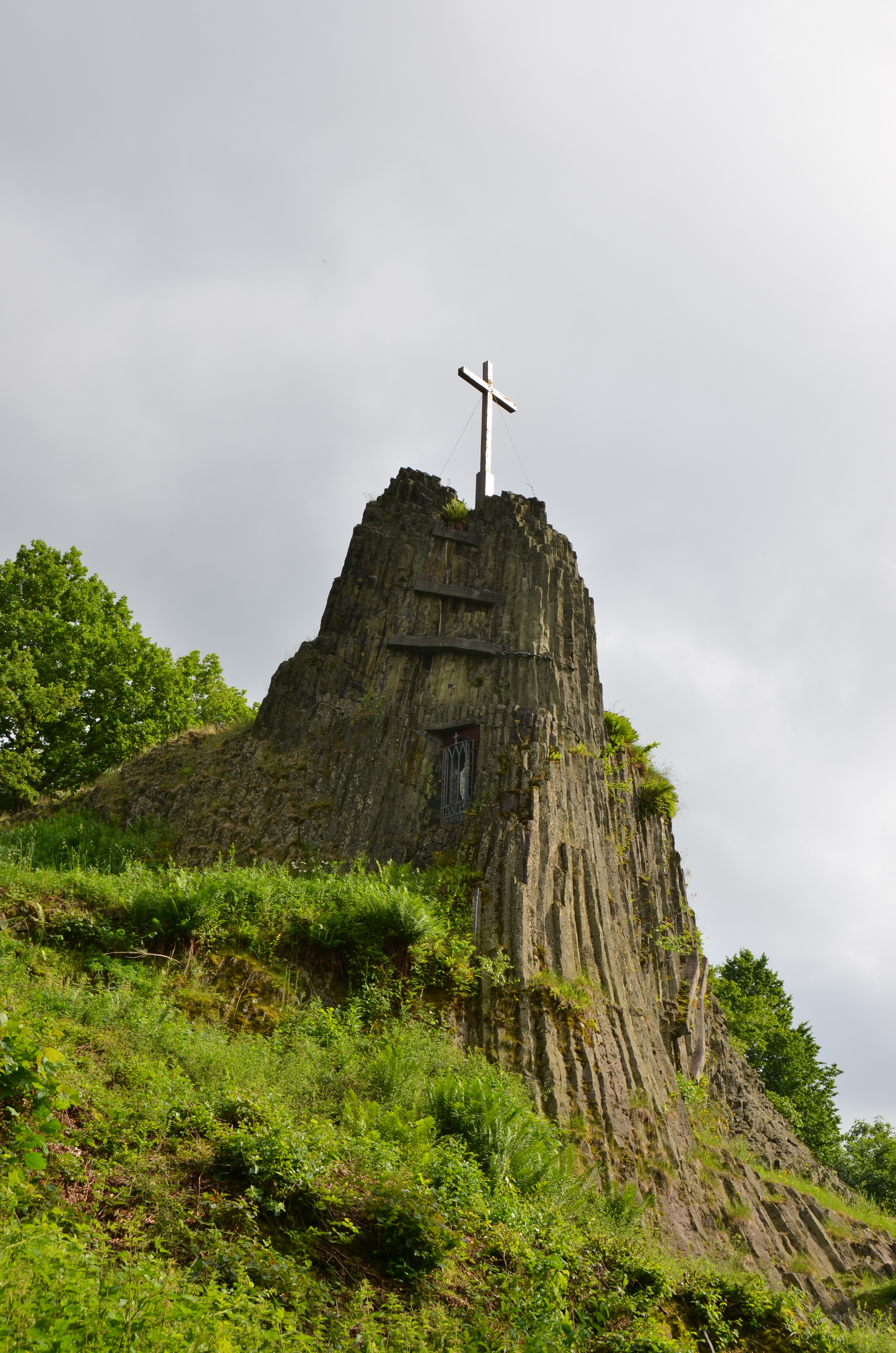
North side with embedded statue of Mary

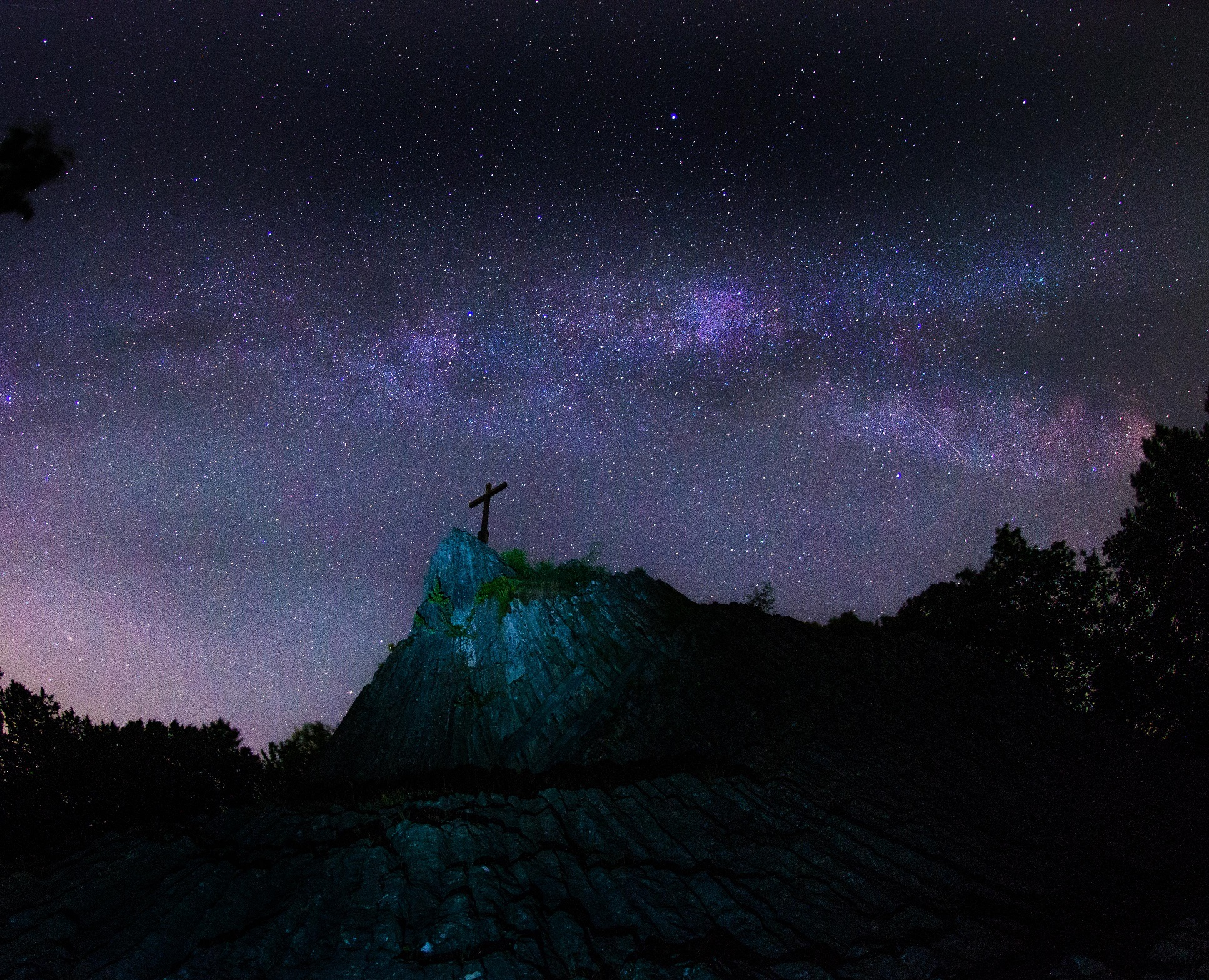
Night photograph of the Druidenstein with the Milky Way

The Druidenstein is a cone-shaped basalt rock in the northern Heller Upland above the town of Kirchen on the Sieg in the parish of Herkersdorf, Altenkirchen, Germany. The basalt cone stands at a height 431 m above sea level (NN) and is about 20 metres high.

== Formation ==
The Druidenstein is about 25 million years old (Young Tertiary) and covers an area of about 100 m^{2}. Its unusual shape was caused when lava forced itself through the Devonian greywacke of the basement and then solidified. As a result, prismatic basalt columns formed at right angles to the cooling surface.

By erosion on the hard basalt core has remained, but this continues to shrink. Other processes have also reduced the size of the basalt cone.

== History ==
The Druidenstein was probably used by the Celts as a religious site and gathering place. The highest tip was probably broken off for tactical reasons during the Thirty Years' War, so that enemy troops could not orient themselves by it. At that time the tip was still visible from a long way off and there were hardly any woods. In 1869 the Druidenstein was placed under protection. Today it is one of around 3,000 natural monuments in the state of Rhineland-Palatinate. In 1979 the Druidenstein was struck by lightning. The strike was so powerful that the basalt cone had to be subsequently supported by six reinforced concrete beams.

In addition the Druidenstein was used as a quarry for road construction.

== Legends ==
What used to take place at the Druidenstein is not proven. However, many legends and myths are linked to it. There are legends of Gallic druids or druidesses, "wild people" and others who are said to have performed rituals and other things at the Druidenstein. It is also likely that the Druidenstein was a religious site of the Chatti, who built a thing site and worshipped the sun here.

== Tourism and culture ==
In the 1950s, festivals took place at the Druidenstein Open Air Stage. Plays such as Es werde Licht (1952), Wandulf der Waldschmied (1954) or Schulze Henrich (1955) were performed by theatre companies from the South Westphalian area. In the early 1960s these festivals ceased.

Today there are occasional open-air concerts at the basalt cone. Every year, processions from Herkersdorf lead to the "Köppel", where a mass is celebrated.
