= Stonemasonry =

Creation of buildings, structures, and sculpture using stone

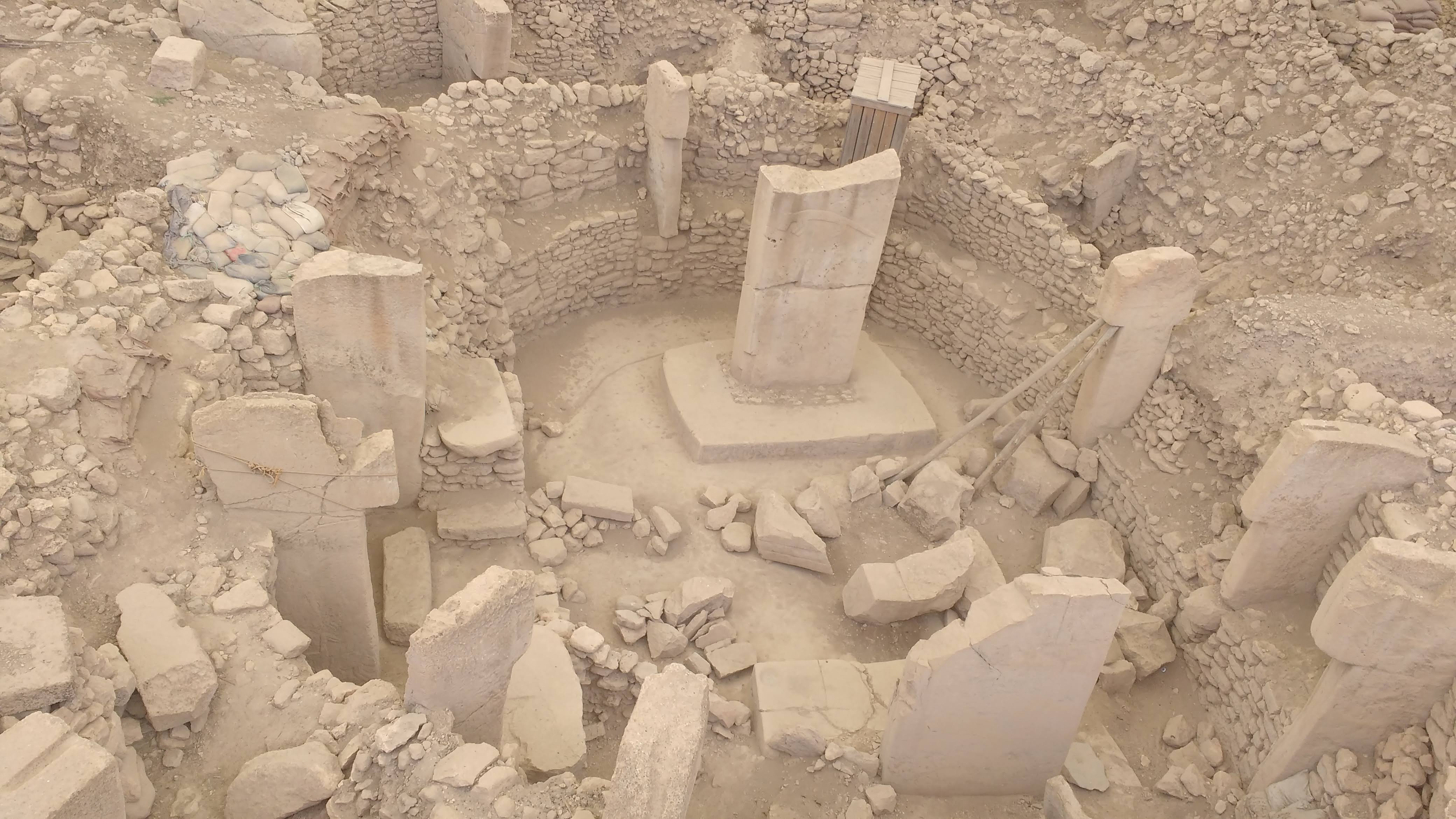
Gobekli Tepe, early monumental Neolithic stonemasonry using flint-carved limestone columns (~9500 BCE)

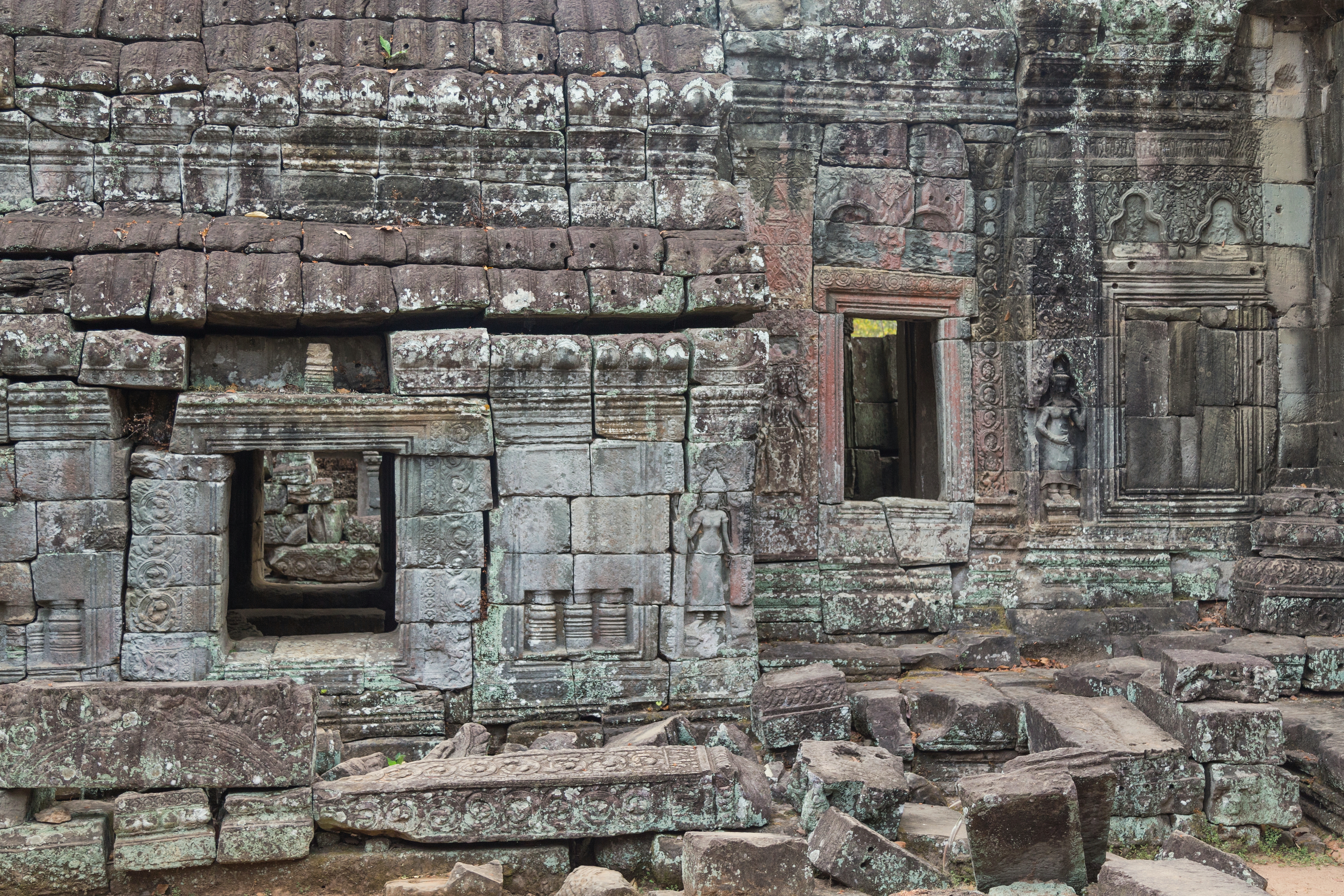
12th-century stonemasonry at Angkor Wat

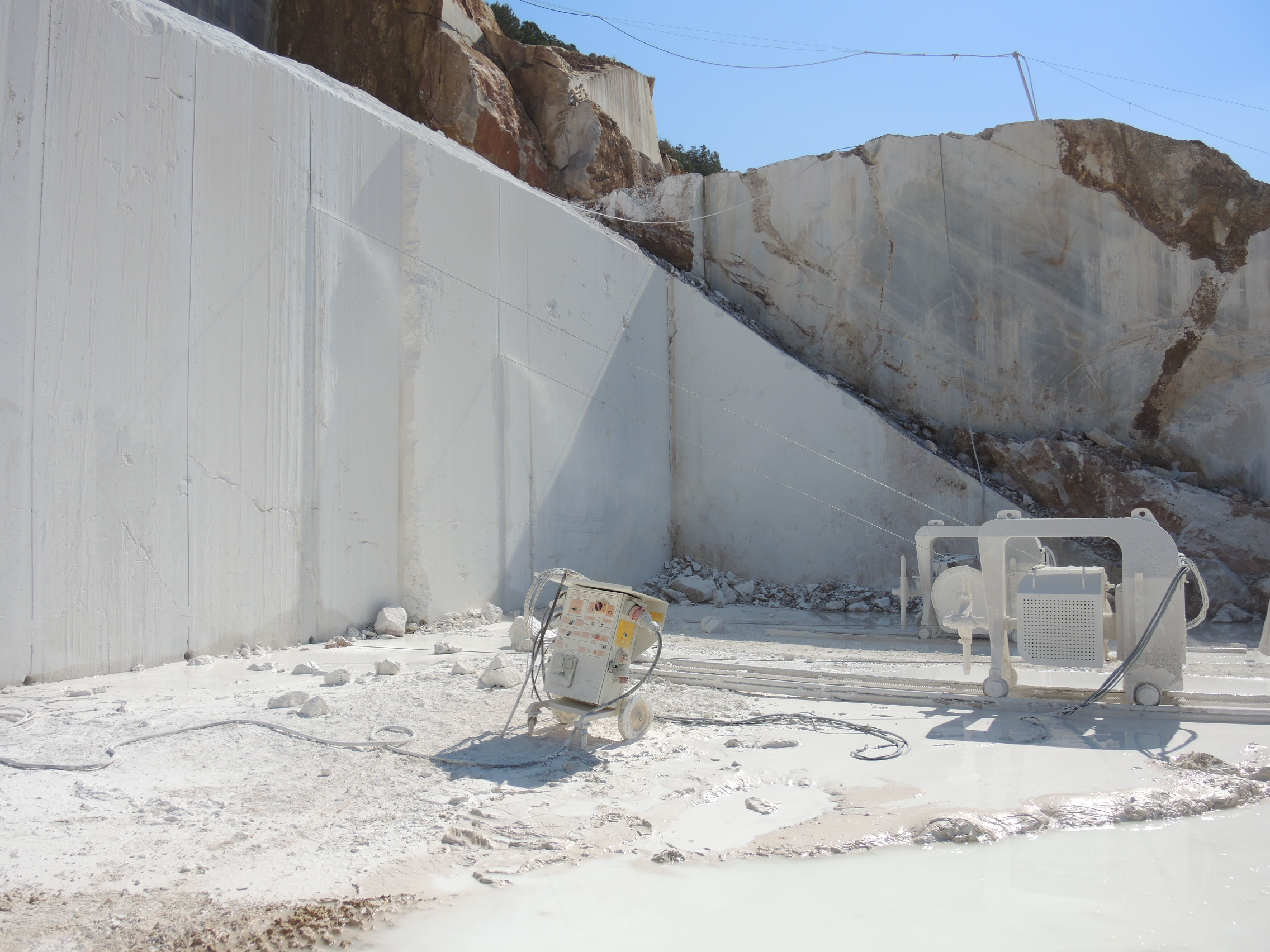
Diamond-wire saw in use for quarrying marble

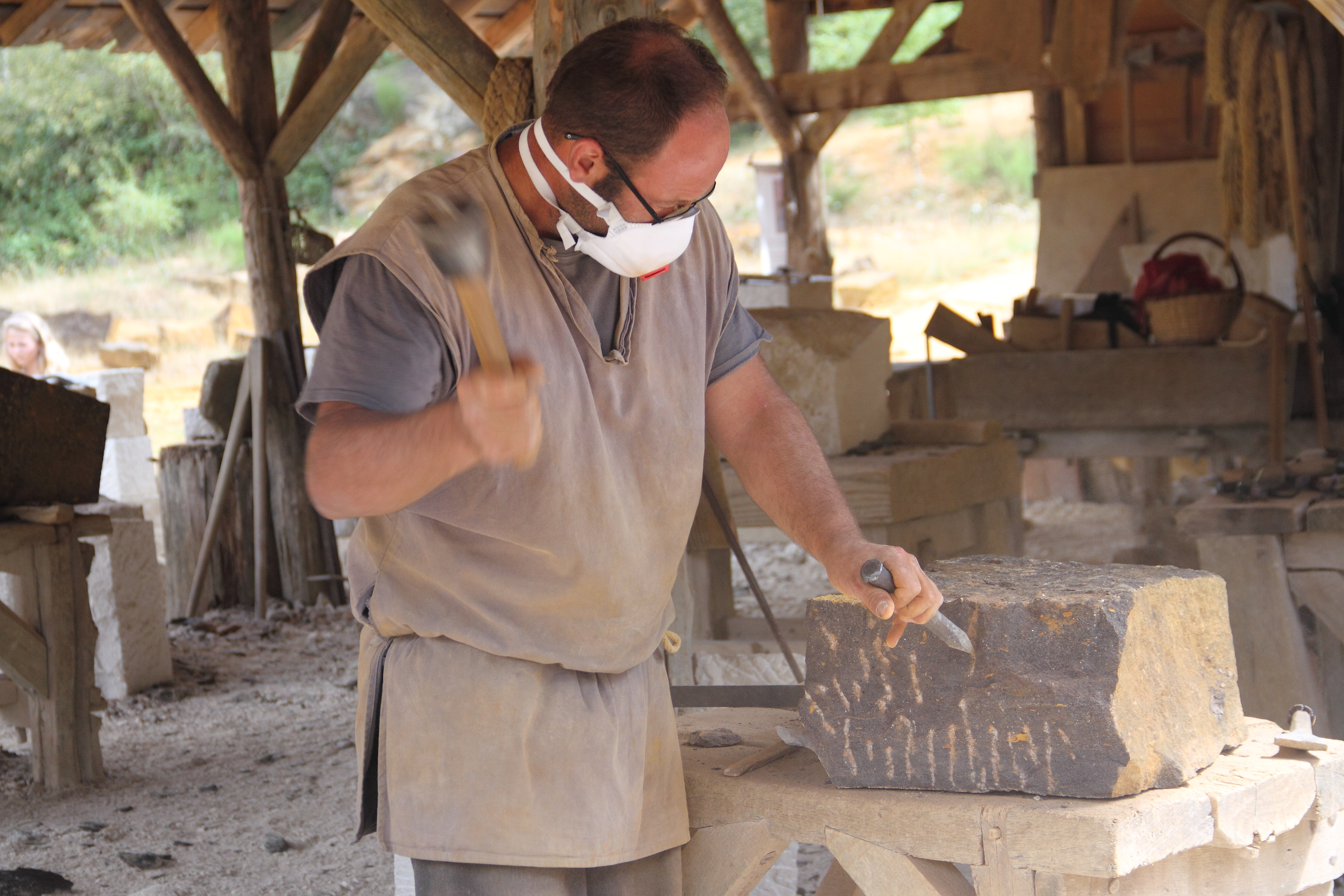
Stonemason working with medieval tools

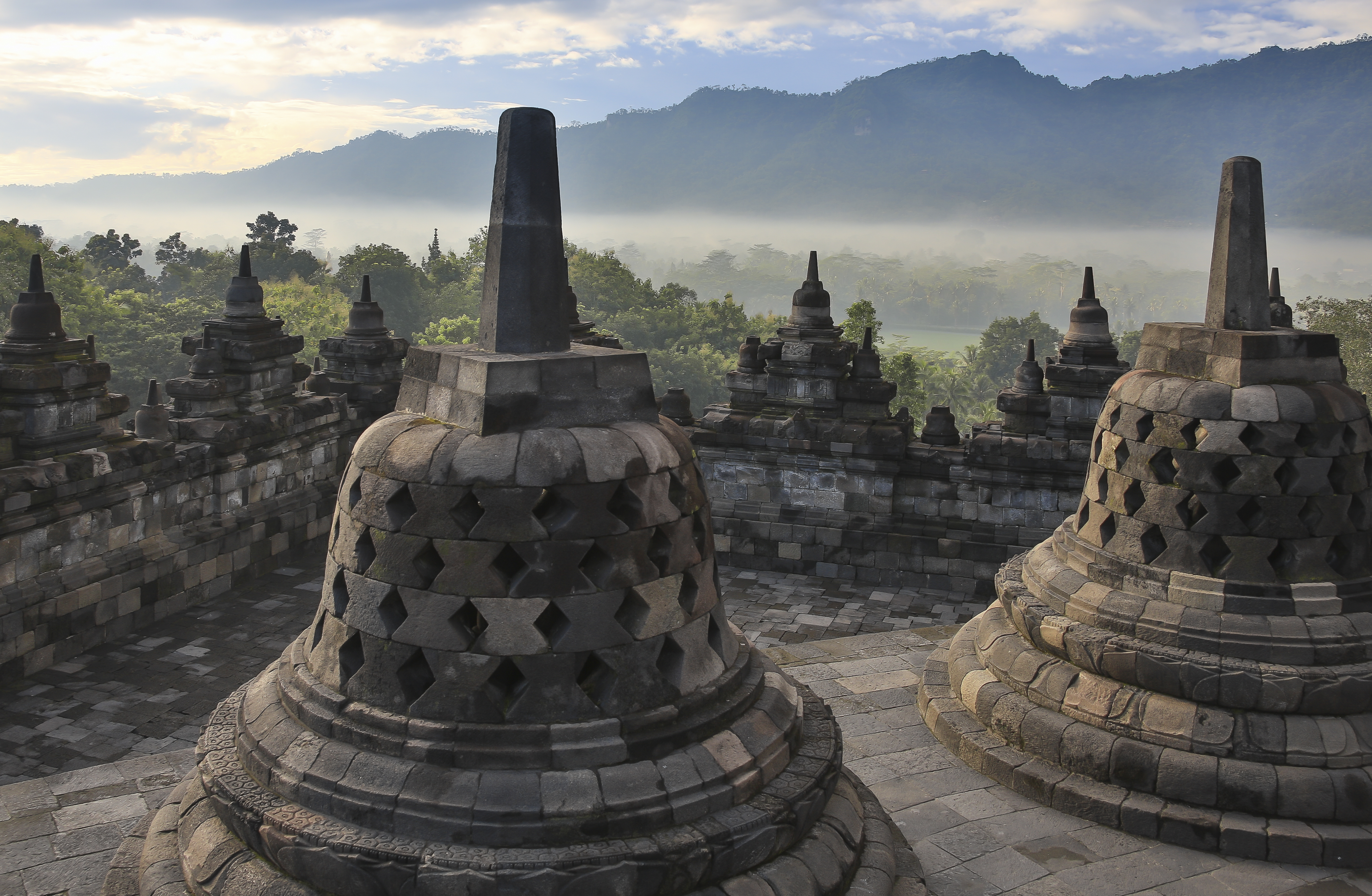
Stonemasonry with andesite, Borobudur, Indonesia

Stonemasonry, also called stonework or stonecraft, is the creation of buildings, structures, and sculpture using stone as the primary material. Stonemasonry is the craft of shaping and arranging stones, often together with mortar and even the ancient lime mortar, to wall or cover formed structures.

The basic tools, methods and skills of the banker mason have existed as a trade for thousands of years. It is one of the oldest activities and professions in human history. Many of the long-lasting, ancient shelters, temples, monuments, artifacts, fortifications, roads, bridges, and entire cities were built of stone. Famous works of stonemasonry include Göbekli Tepe, the Egyptian pyramids, the Taj Mahal, Cusco's Incan Wall, Taqwesan, Easter Island's statues, Angkor Wat, Borobudur, Tihuanaco, Tenochtitlan, Persepolis, the Parthenon, Stonehenge, the Great Wall of China, the Mesoamerican pyramids, Chartres Cathedral, and the Stari Most.

While stone was important traditionally, it fell out of use in the modern era, in favor of brick and steel-reinforced concrete. This is despite the advantages of stone over concrete. Those advantages include:

- Many types of stone are stronger than concrete in compression.
- Stone uses much less energy to produce, and hence its production emits less carbon dioxide than either brick or concrete.
- Stone is widely considered aesthetically pleasing, while concrete is often painted or clad.

Modern stonemasonry is in the process of reinventing itself for automation, modern load-bearing stone construction, innovative reinforcement techniques, and integration with other sustainable materials, like engineered wood.

== Stonemasonry disciplines ==
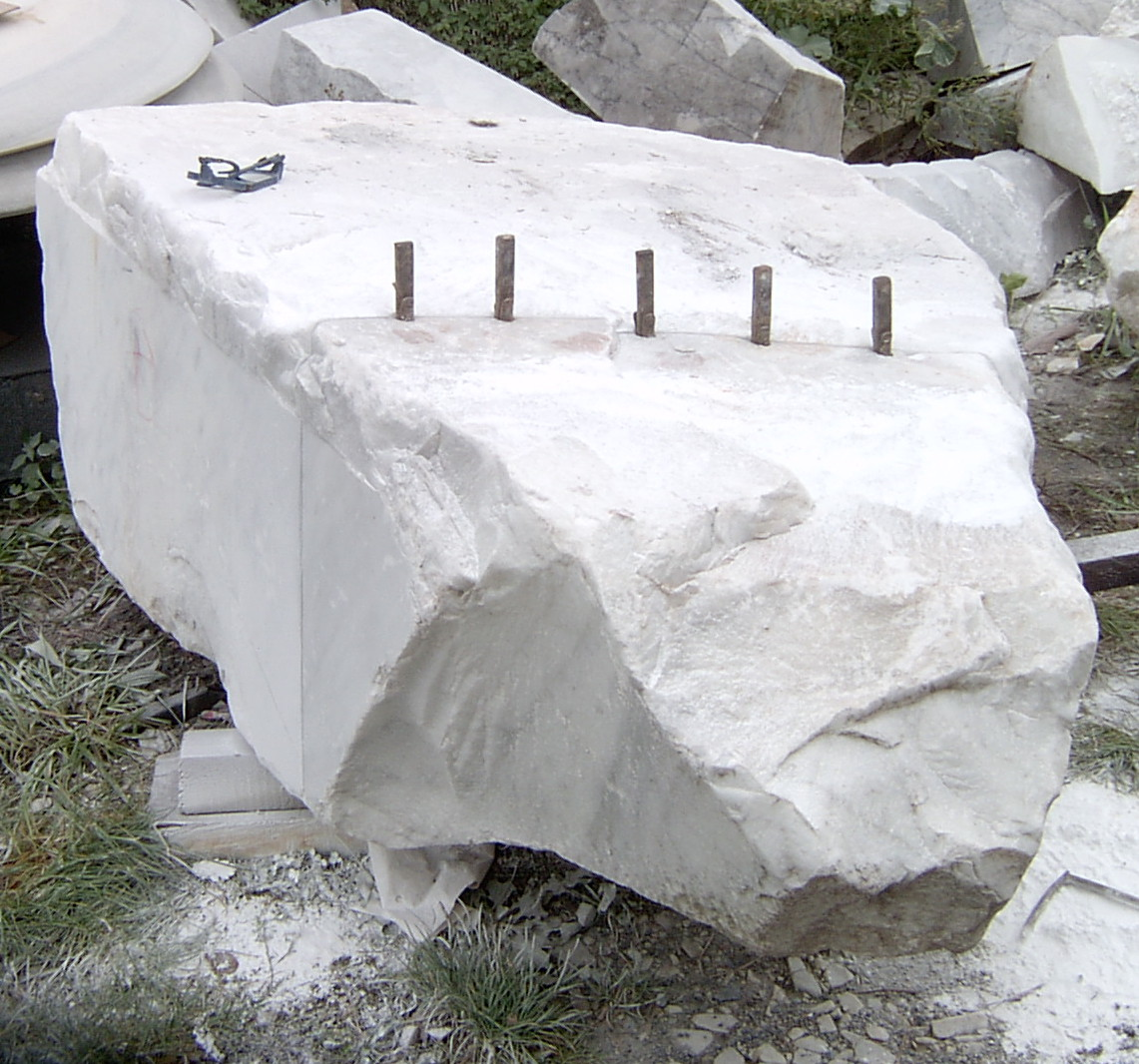
Splitting a block of marble with plug and feathers

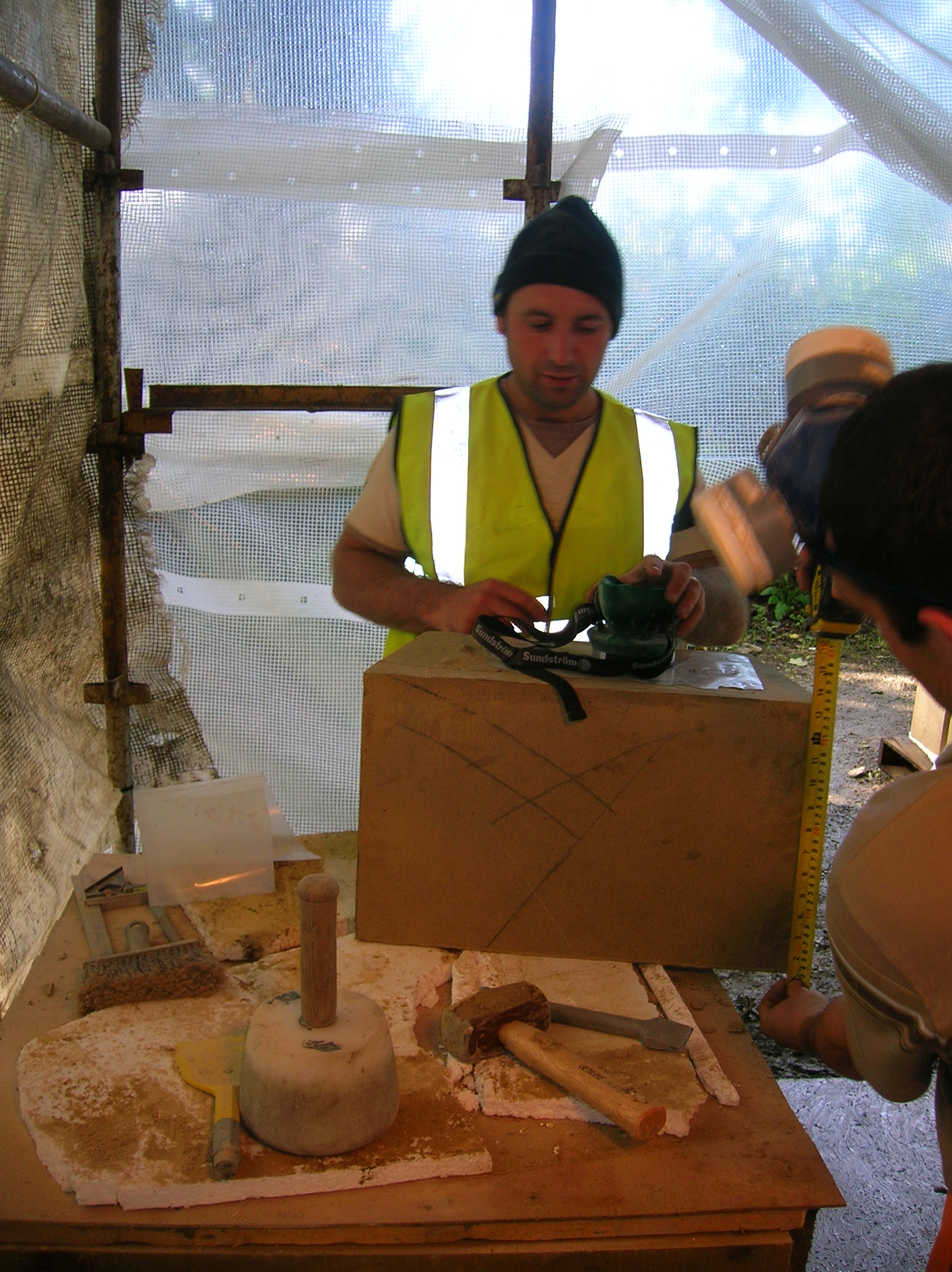
A stonemason at Eglinton Tournament Bridge with a selection of tools of the trade

- A quarryman splits or cuts rock in the quarry, and extracts the resulting blocks of stone. The cut or split pieces are collected and transported away from the extraction surface for further refinement.
- A sawyer stonemason cuts these stone blocks into dimension stone, to required size with saws. The resulting block, if ordered for a specific component, is known as sawn six sides (SSS). A sawyer mason is similar to a banker mason (see below) in that they work with rough pieces of stone and shape them according to certain standards. The main difference between a sawyer mason and a banker mason is the size of the stone they work with. A sawyer mason typically works with much larger pieces and uses diamond-coated tools. Sawyer masons may work in quarries or be found in tile or flooring stores, possessing a range of specific skills, such as examining grain patterns to determine cleavage, creating smaller stones from larger pieces, and carving precise outlines and drilling holes using various tools like chisels.
- A banker mason, sometimes referred to as a bank mason, is workshop-based, and specializes in working the stones into the shapes required by a building's design, this set out on templets and a bed mould. A banker mason uses various hand and power tools to cut, carve, and shape stone. They can produce anything from stones with simple chamfers to tracery windows, detailed mouldings and the more classical architectural building masonry. When working a stone from a sawn block, the mason ensures that the stone is bedded in the right way, so the finished work sits in the building in the same orientation as it was formed on the ground. Occasionally though some stones need to be oriented correctly for the application; this includes voussoirs, jambs, copings, and cornices. The stone's size and shape are usually predetermined by builders or other parties involved in a project, and the banker mason works according to a brief or a set of designs provided for that project. Once the stone has been crafted to the required specifications, it is transported to the construction site or another location for use in a building or other structure.
- A fixer mason specializes in the fixing of stones onto buildings, using lifting tackle, and traditional lime mortars and grouts. Sometimes modern cements, mastics, and epoxy resins are used, usually on specialist applications such as stone cladding. Metal fixings, from simple dowels and cramps to specialized single application fixings, are also used. The precise tolerances necessarily make this a highly skilled job. A fixer mason is responsible for traveling to a job site to fit and lay pre-prepared stone or cladding for buildings. They might do this with grouts, mortars, and lifting tackle. They might also use things like single application specialized fixings, simple cramps, and dowels as well as stone cladding with things like epoxy resins, mastics, and modern cements.
- A memorial mason or monumental mason carves gravestones and inscriptions.
- A carver mason crosses the line from craft to art. They use their artistic ability to carve stone into foliage, figures, animals or abstract designs. Carver masons are the artists of stonemasonry, responsible for creating designs and/or patterns from stone, as well as on stones. This work can include stone sculptures of figures or animals, or other projects of a similar nature. Throughout history, carver masons have been renowned for their exceptional skills in crafting beautiful pieces from stone.

== Classical stonemasonry techniques ==
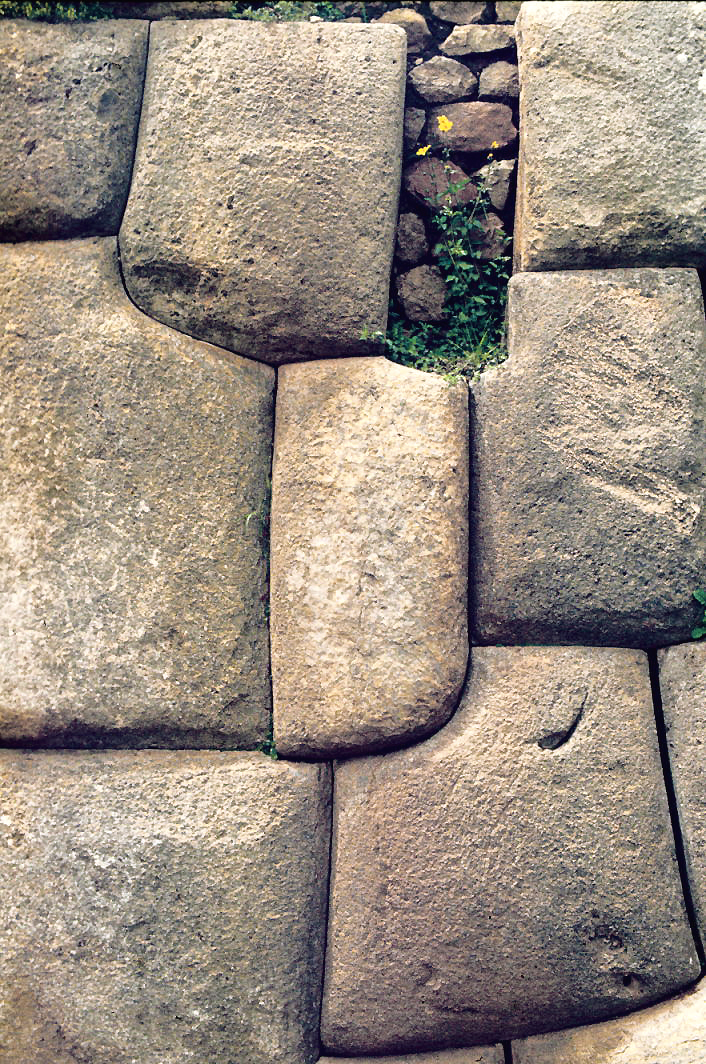
Precisely interfaced blocks at Sacsayhuamán citadel in Cusco, Peru

Stone has been used in construction for thousands of years, in many contexts. Listed below are six types of classical stonemasonry techniques, some of which still see widespread use.

- Ashlar masonry. Stone masonry using dressed (cut) stones is known as ashlar masonry.
- Trabeated systems. One of the oldest forms of stone construction uses a lintel (beam) laid across stone posts or columns. This method predates Stonehenge, and refined versions were used by the Egyptians, Persians, Greeks, and Romans.
- Arch masonry. Also called "arcuated systems" in contrast with trabeated systems, which are two ancient methods for creating a void below a stone span (either a lintel or an arch). Note that the Wikipedia page on stone arches is about stone-arch bridges exclusively, and the arch page is about all arches, including non-stone.
- Rubble masonry. Use of rubble in masonry: antonymous to ashlar masonry. Can be infill in an ashlar wall, used in cyclopean concrete, and other contexts. The term is antonymous to "ashlar".
- Dry stone. Stone walls built without mortar, using the shape of the stones, compression, and friction for stability. This technique encompasses cyclopean masonry and other mortar-less methods, but is conventionally used to describe agricultural walls used to mark boundaries, contain livestock, and retain soil.
- Cyclopean masonry. Drywall construction using massive boulders that may have been shaped to fit together. Polygonal masonry is a subtype of cyclopean masonry where the boulders are shaped into polygonal profiles.

== Modern stonemasonry systems ==
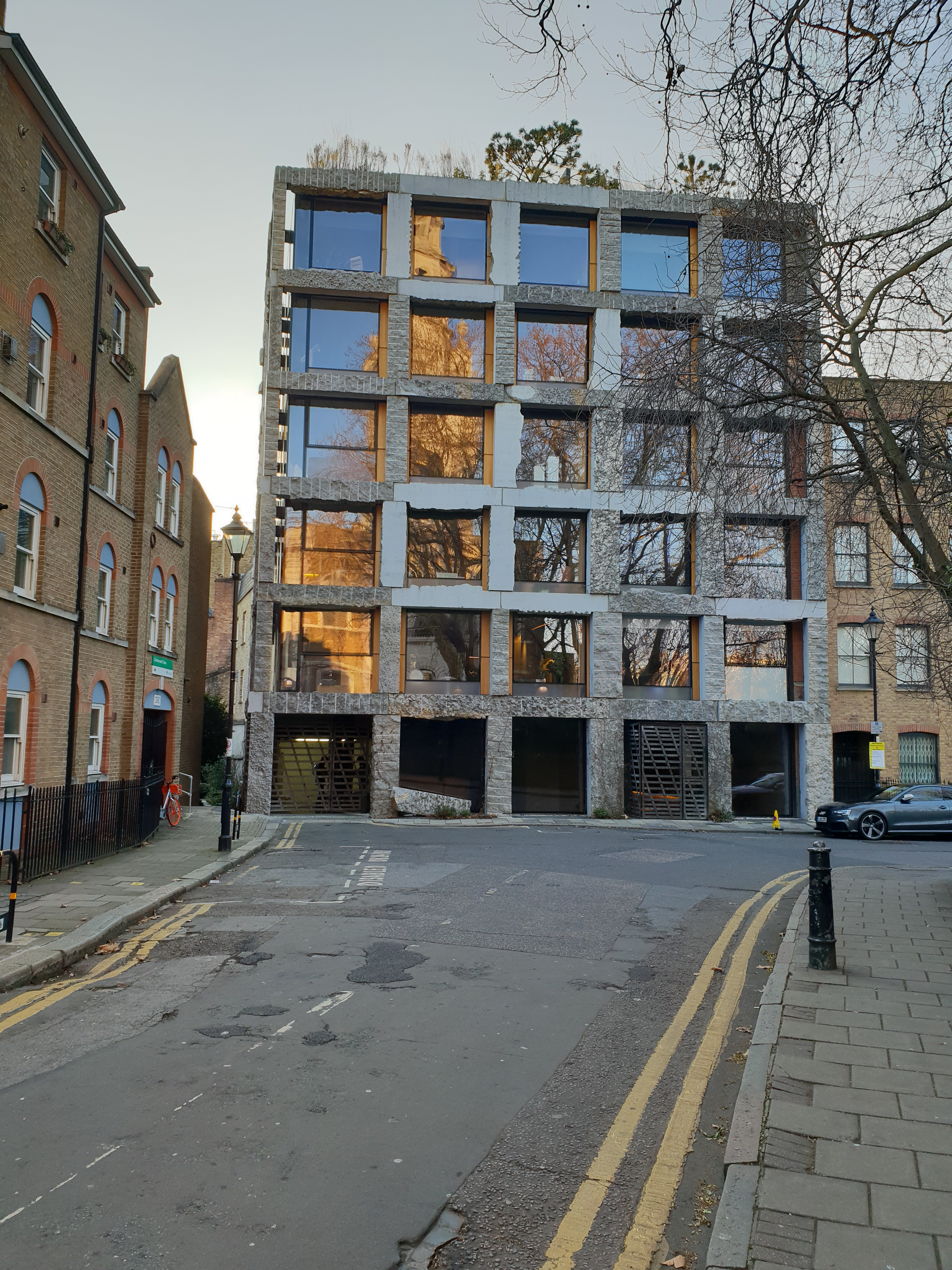
15 Clerkenwell Close in London uses a trabeated exoskeleton.

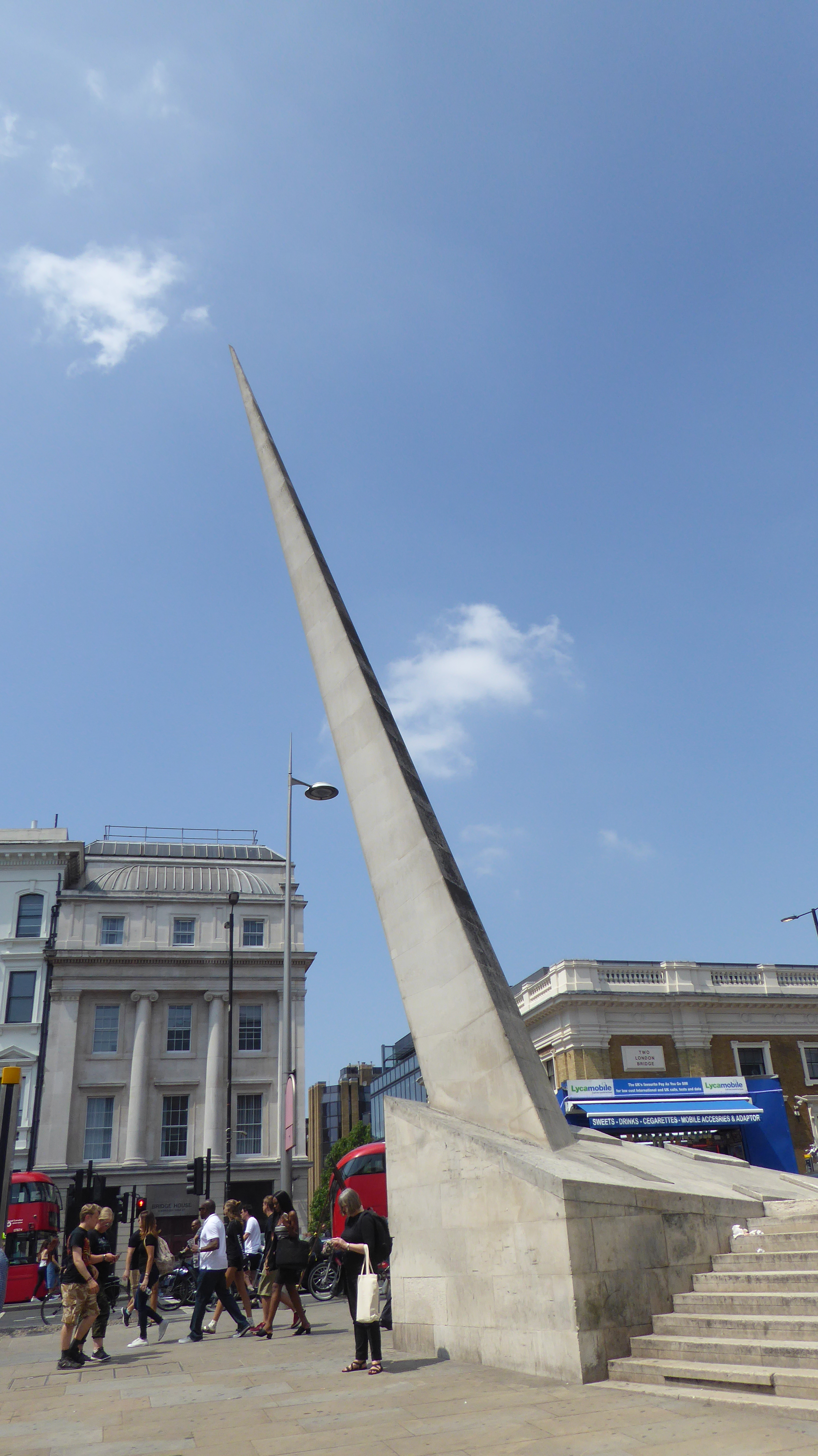
Southwark Gateway Needle, a post-tensioned stone structure

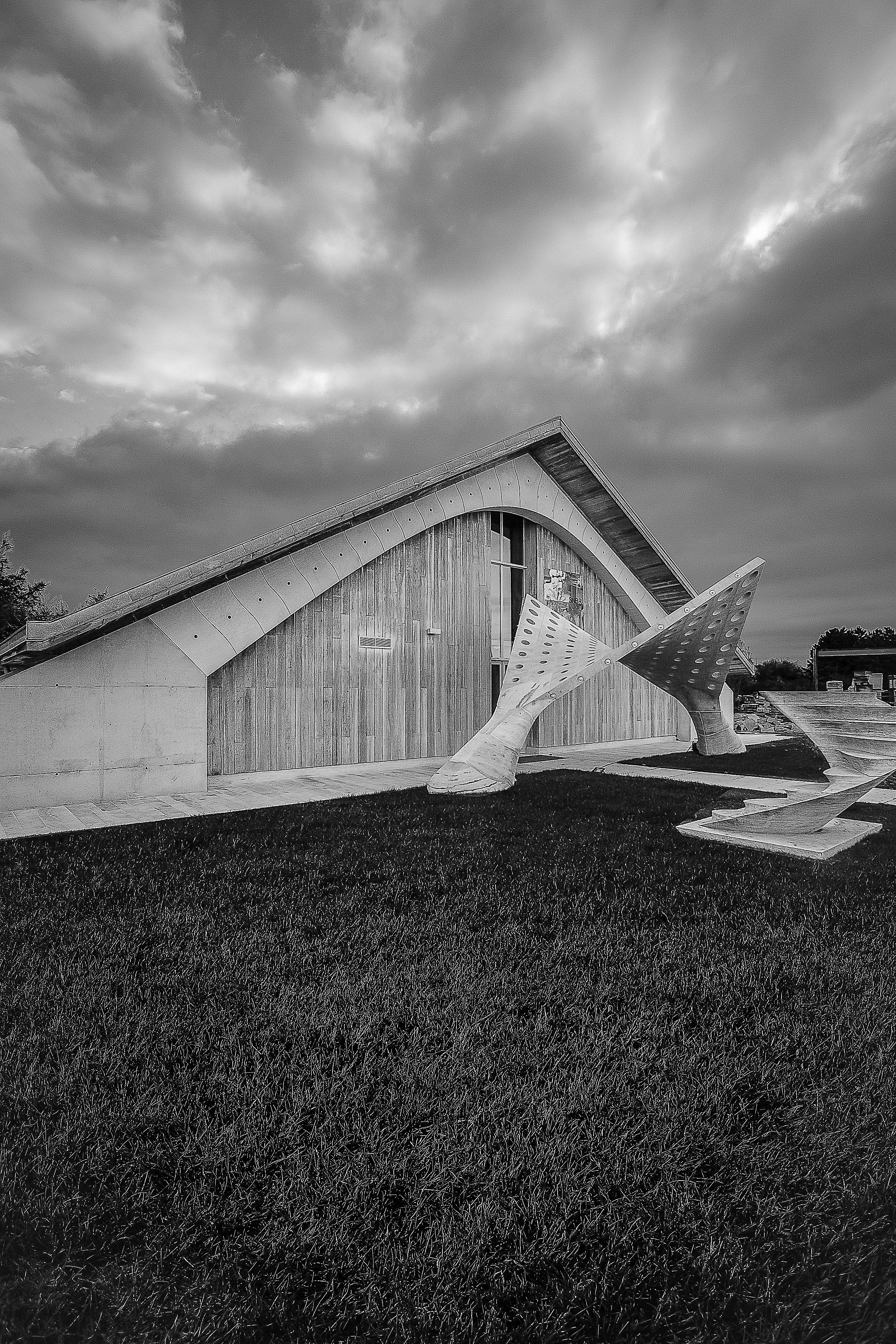
A stone sculpture constructed using digital stereotomy

In the modern era, stone has been largely relegated to being a cosmetic element of buildings, often used as decorative cladding on steel-reinforced concrete. This is despite its wide historical use in large compressive structures: 50-m bridges and colosseums in Roman times, ~65-m tall cathedrals since the Middle Ages, and 12-story apartment buildings built in the 1690s.

=== Modern stonemasonry techniques ===
- Stone veneer is used as a protective and decorative covering for interior or exterior walls and surfaces. The veneer is typically 1 in (25.4 mm) thick and must weigh less than 15 lb per square foot (73 kg m^{−2}) so that no additional structural supports are required. The structural wall is put up first, and thin, flat stones are mortared onto the face of the wall. Metal tabs in the structural wall are mortared between the stones to tie everything together, to prevent the stonework from separating from the wall.
- Massive precut stone. Also known as "prefabricated stone", "massive stone", "pre-sized stone", or "pré-taille" stone.
- Post-tensioned stone. A high-performance composite construction material consisting of stone held in compression with tension elements. The tension elements can be connected to the outside of the stone, but more typically uses tendons threaded internally through a duct formed from aligned drilled holes.
- Pre-tensioned stone. Using an epoxy shear connector, early experiments have shown that it is possible to pre-tension stone, maintaining the tendon under tension while the liquid epoxy is injected and allowed to set.
- Digital stereotomy. Using CAD and computer models of load, modern designers are able to cut complex vaults, arches, and other arrangements of precisely cut ashlars. Antecedents to this discipline include curved vaults, and also flat vaults that use a concentric flat arch vault and the Abeille flat vault. Using digital design and machining, such compression structures can be shapes into complex compressive structures. Leaders in this area include Giuseppe Fallacara and Philippe Block.
- Trabeated stone exoskeleton. In the modern era, post-and-lintel construction was adapted use as a stone exoskeleton in the design of 15 Clerkenwell Close. The stone exoskeleton method is a variant of the massive precut stone method: the ends of the posts and lintels are precisely precut offsite prior to assembly by crane. At least two more trabeated stone exoskeleton high-rise buildings are underway, one in London, and another in Bristol.
- Stone bricks. Small stone ashlars that are cut by the quarry to brick sizing to allow their use in standardized brick-laying workflows. Cost is similar to clay composite bricks, but with greatly reduced carbon emissions. As stone does not change size like fired clay bricks, brick-sized stone ashlars do not require expansion joints.
- Cyclopean concrete. This method uses a combination of cyclopean masonry and rubble masonry: boulders and or rubble are placed in a form (or in a ditch), and concrete is poured on top to bind the stones together before removing the form. Variations of this include Frank Lloyd Wright's 'desert masonry' and Institut Balear de l'Habitatge's cyclopean concrete blocks, which are cast in a large slab and precisely sawn for use as prefabricated masonry in the massive precut stone system.
- Slipform stonemasonry is a variation of Cyclopean concrete stone-wall construction that uses formwork to contain the rocks and mortar while keeping the walls straight. Short forms, up to two feet tall, are placed on both sides of the wall to serve as a guide for the stonework. Stones are placed inside the forms with the good faces against the formwork. Concrete is poured behind the rocks. Rebar is added for strength, to make a wall that is approximately half reinforced concrete and half stonework. The wall can be faced with stone on one side or both sides.
- Formwork stone. "Pierre banchée" in French. Uses stone tiles or ashlars as shuttering for pouring concrete. These are left in place after the concrete sets. This is the inverse procedure to stone cladding, where the stone tiles are attached to the concrete after the temporary shuttering has been removed. Developed by Fernand Pouillon to accelerate construction. Formwork stone is distinct from cyclopean concrete in that the former uses rectilinear tiles, while the latter uses boulders and/or cobblestone.

=== Massive precut stone ===
Massive precut stone is also known as "prefabricated", or "pre-sized" stone is a modern method of building with load-bearing stone. Precut stone is a DFMA construction method that uses large machine-cut stone blocks with precisely defined dimensions to rapidly assemble buildings in which stone is used as a major or the primary load-bearing material.

Massive precut stone construction was originally developed by Fernand Pouillon in the postwar period. He referred to the method as "pierre de taille" or "pré-taille" stone. It became possible through innovations by Pouillon and Paul Marcerou, a masonry engineer at a quarry in Fontvieille, to adapt high-precision saws from the timber industry to quarrying and stone sawing.

The key technique of massive precut (MP) stone is to cut stone ashlars to precise dimensions that match the architect's plan such that the stones can be dropped into place by crane for rapid construction. The blocks may be numbered so that the masons can follow the plan procedurally. The use of massive blocks reduces costs by minimizing sawing and fixer-masonry costs. The use of a crane reduces labor, accelerates construction, and allows the masons to precisely and quickly position the blocks.

==== Design features of massive precut stone ====
MP stone is defined by four design attributes.

- Load-bearing stone. This distinguishes it from cosmetic precut stone, which is used for cladding decoration. Historically, load-bearing stone is the most durable construction method.
- Massive block sizes. The heuristic definition of 'massive stone' is a block that is too heavy to be lifted by hand. Using massive dimensions has three critical benefits: (1) minimizing cuts, which lowers cost and shortens production time, (2) increasing the thermal mass of walls for temperature regulation in the building, and (3) making use of crane construction, thereby lowering manual labor, shortening assembly time, reducing mortar, labor, and cost.
- Precise offsite dimension cuts. Precutting can be done at the quarry, or at a masonry workshop by sawyer and banker masons. The precision amounts to a form of prefabrication, such that the masons do not have to make adjustments onsite, and construction is an assembly process. Precise ashlar interfaces also reduce the amount of mortar required.

==== Types of massive precut stone construction ====
- Massive precut ashlars. Blocks cut precisely on four to six sides, used to assemble walls, lintels over windows and doors, and in flat arches.
- End-shaped massive precut posts and lintels. Quarry-finished blocks with precisely shaped ends for assembly into post-and-lintel frameworks.
- Massive cyclopean concrete blocks. Developed by IBAVI in Mallorca, rough stones are placed in a mold and saturated with concrete. The concrete is sawn into massive ashlars for crane assembly. Enables reuse of rough plum stones from traditional stone masonry.

==== Benefits of massive precut stone construction ====
MP stone construction has advantages over conventional masonry and concrete construction.

- Build speed. The use of precisely cut and numbered ashlars, combined with crane-assisted assembly, significantly reduces construction time compared to traditional stone-masonry techniques. Compared to concrete construction, MP stone is faster as there is no setting wait time.
- Cost reduction. Compared to brick masonry or smaller ashlars, using larger stone blocks and thereby minimizing sawing and fixer-masonry costs, the overall expense of constructing a building can be reduced.
- Labor efficiency. The use of cranes and a well-organized construction plan reduces the labor required, lowering costs and reducing the wait time for skilled mason availability.
- Design efficiency. The precision of machine-cut ashlars allows for more modularity in design, enabling architects to create building designs quickly.
- Durability. Buildings constructed using massive precut stone maintain the inherent durability and longevity of stone construction, offering long-lasting and low-maintenance structures. At least one study of a modern 20-storey unreinforced MP-stone tower has suggested this method has good seismic resilience: "With regard to the current Algerian seismic design regulation, the results obtained in terms of time period, frequency, storey drifts and displacements showed that the… (Diar Es Saada massive precut stone)… tower can be considered as an earthquake-resistant building fulfilling the required structural safety conditions."
- Aesthetics. Compared to concrete and other materials, massive precut stone construction yields visually striking and distinctive buildings that showcase the natural beauty of stone.
- Environmental benefits. The use of a material with lower embedded carbon contributes to a more sustainable building process, minimizing the environmental impact. Lower carbon emissions: load-bearing stone construction emits around one-tenth the carbon as a comparable concrete building. As 80% of energy is non-grid fossil fuel, and construction is responsible for 8% of carbon emissions, the replacement of coal-burning concrete production with lower-energy dimension-stone production could have a substantial impact on net-zero goals.
- Reusability. When a building has reached the end of its usefulness, massive rectilinear ashlars are easily reused in new construction.
- Thermal performance. As with traditional stone construction, massive precut stone buildings benefit from excellent thermal mass, helping to regulate indoor temperatures and reduce energy consumption for heating and cooling.

==== History of massive precut stone ====
Fernand Pouillon pioneered the use of massive precut stone in modern architecture. During the post-war period, his innovative approach to stone construction led to the development of numerous noteworthy projects, with a particular focus on housing. Throughout his long career, Pouillon played a crucial role in the development and popularization of massive precut stone construction techniques. His pioneering work laid the foundation for subsequent architects to build upon and innovate, leading to the resurgence and expansion of this construction method in the 2020s, with the rise of interest in low-carbon durable construction.

=== Tensioned stone ===
Post-tensioned stone (PT stone) is a high-performance composite construction material: stone held in compression with tension elements. The tension elements can be connected to the outside of the stone, but more typically uses tendons threaded internally through a duct formed from aligned drilled holes.

Post-tensioned stone may consist of a single piece, but drill limitations and other considerations mean it is typically an assembly of multiple components with mortar between pieces. PT stone has been used in both vertical columns (posts), and in horizontal beams (lintels). It has also been used in more unusual engineering applications: arch stabilization, flexible foot bridges, and cantilevered sculptures.

Tensioned stone has a close affiliation with massive precut stone as two central techniques of modern stonemasonry.

==== Rationale ====
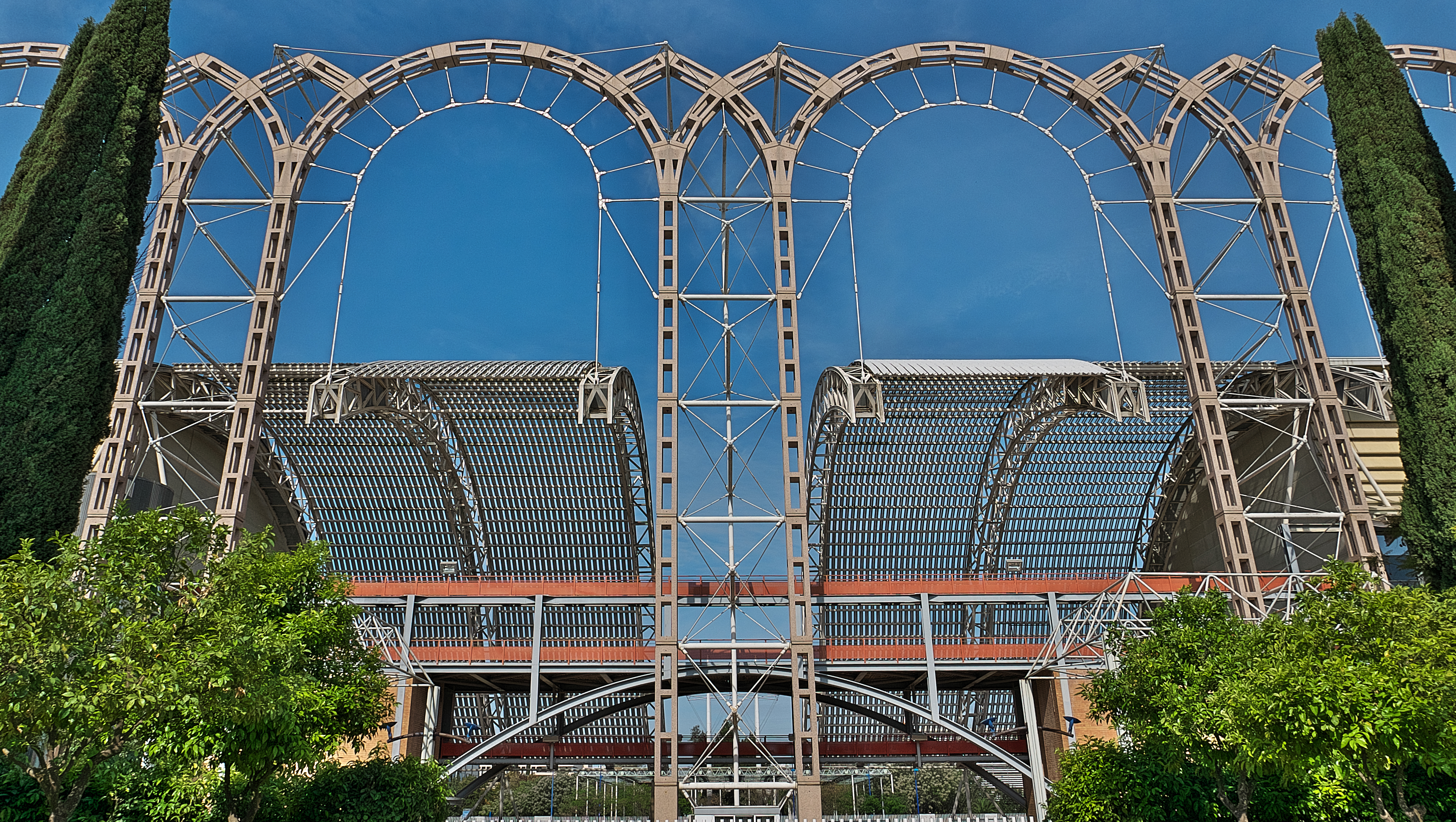
Pavilion of the Future, Seville Expo'92: the first completed new building using post-tensioned stone

"Post-tensioned stone increases the failure load of stone in bending, but also the stiffness of a structure by reducing joint cracking. This method of construction is widely used for concrete structures, but the advantages of using similar techniques with stone are only just being realised".

Stone has great compressive strength, so is ideal in compressive structures like stone arches. However, it has relatively weak flexural strength (compared to steel or wood), so in isolation cannot be safely used in wide spans under tension.

For concrete, this problem has been long solved: in addition to conventional tensile reinforcement, engineers developed prestressed concrete methods starting around 1888. Such tension-reinforced concrete applications combine compressive strength with pre-stressed tensile compression for combined strength much greater than either of the individual components, and have been in wide use for decades. As for concrete, post-tensioning maintains stone in compression, thereby increasing its strength.

Post-tensioning is achieved by threading steel tendons either through ducts within the stone elements or along their surface. Once the stone components are in place, the tendons are tensioned using hydraulic jacks, and the force is transferred to the stone through anchorages located at the ends of the tendons. The tensioning process imparts a compressive force to the stone, which improves its capacity to resist tensile stresses that could otherwise cause cracking or failure.

===== Energy use and carbon emissions =====
Stone is "natural precast concrete", so only needs to be cut (and strength tested) and post-tensioned prior to use in construction. Compared to concrete and steel, post-tensioned stone production has dramatically lower energy costs, with concomitant lower carbon emissions.

== History of stonemasonry ==
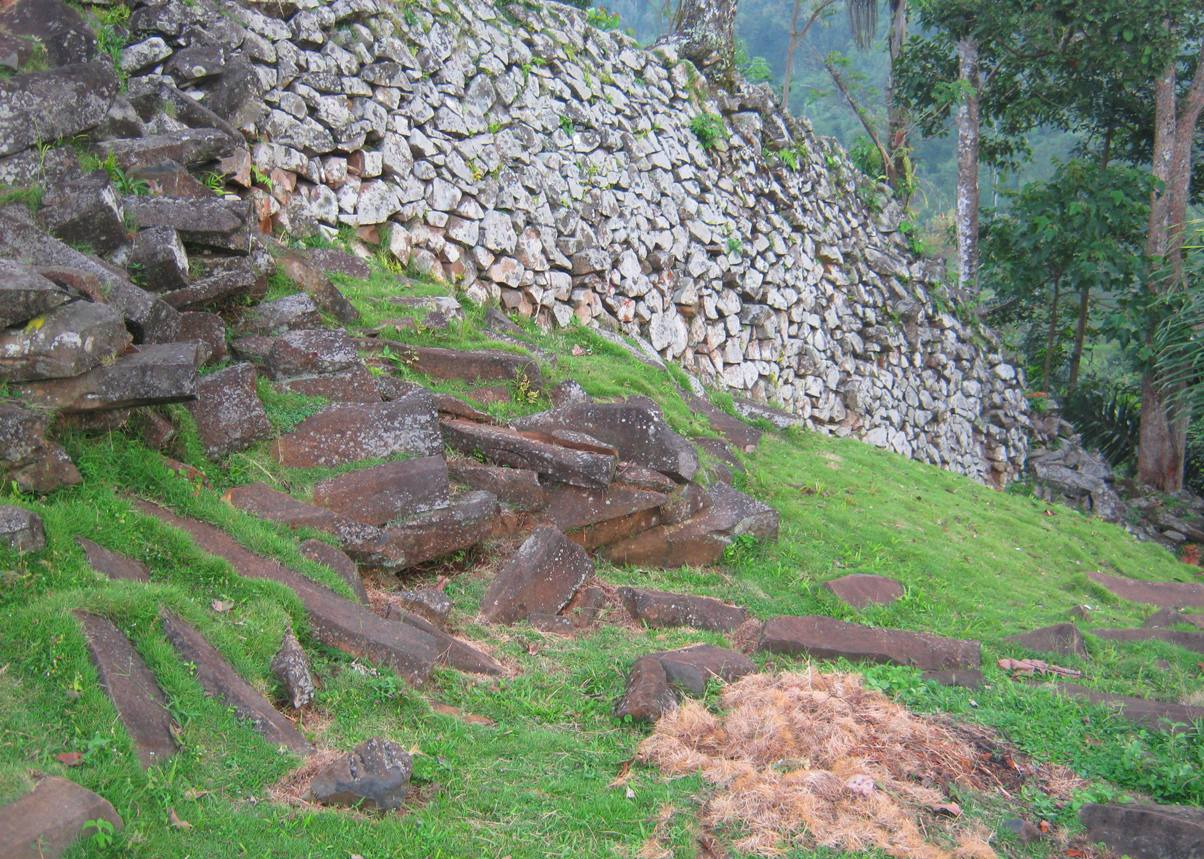
Gunung Padang, West Java. Stonemasonry retaining wall.

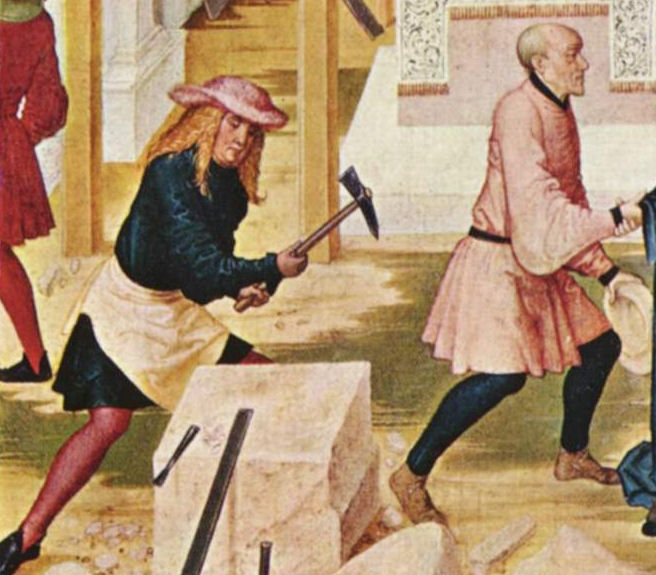
Bavarian stonemasons, c. 1505

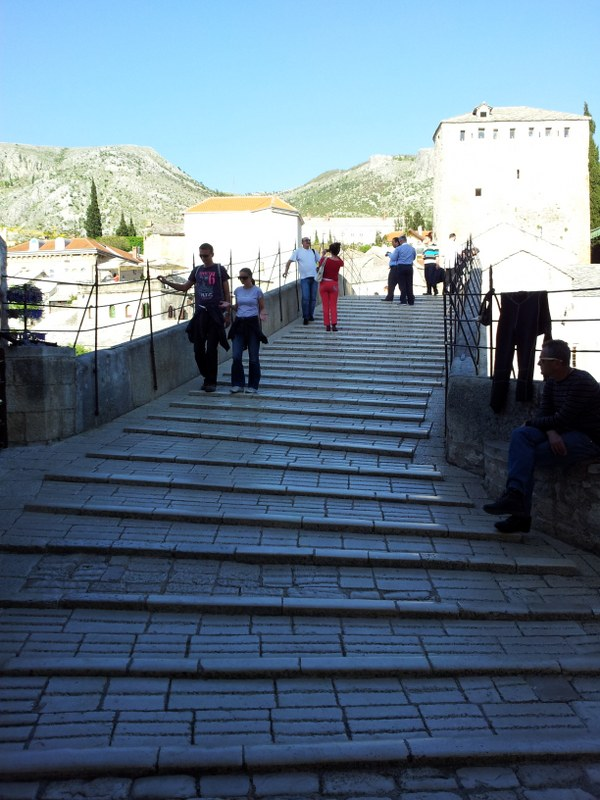
Stonemasonry on 16th c. Ottoman-made bridge in Mostar, Bosnia and Herzegovina – Stari Most

Stonemasonry emerged in the Neolithic Revolution alongside the development of heat-processed construction materials like quicklime, plaster, and mortar. People began to arrange these materials into homes, and thus began the practice of stonemasonry.

The Ancients heavily relied on the stonemason to build the most impressive and long-lasting monuments to their civilizations. The Egyptians built their pyramids, the civilizations of Central America had their step pyramids, the Persians their palaces, the Greeks their temples, and the Romans their public works and wonders (See Roman Architecture and Roman masonry). People of the Indus Valley Civilization, such as at Dholavira made entire cities characterized by stone architecture. Among the famous ancient stonemasons is Sophroniscus, the father of Socrates, who was a stone-cutter.

Castle building was an entire industry for the medieval stonemasons. When the Western Roman Empire fell, building in dressed stone decreased in much of Western Europe, and there was a resulting increase in timber-based construction. Stonework experienced a resurgence in the 9th and 10th centuries in Europe, and by the 12th-century religious fervour resulted in the construction of thousands of impressive churches and cathedrals in stone across Western Europe.

Medieval stonemasons' skills were in high demand, and members of the guild, gave rise to three classes of stonemasons: apprentices, journeymen, and master masons. Apprentices were indentured to their masters as the price for their training, journeymen were qualified craftsmen who were paid by the day, and master masons were considered freemen who could travel as they wished to work on the projects of the patrons and could operate as self-employed craftsmen and train apprentices. During the Renaissance, the stonemason's guild admitted members who were not stonemasons, and eventually evolved into the Society of Freemasonry; fraternal groups which observe the traditional culture of stonemasons but are not typically involved in modern construction projects.

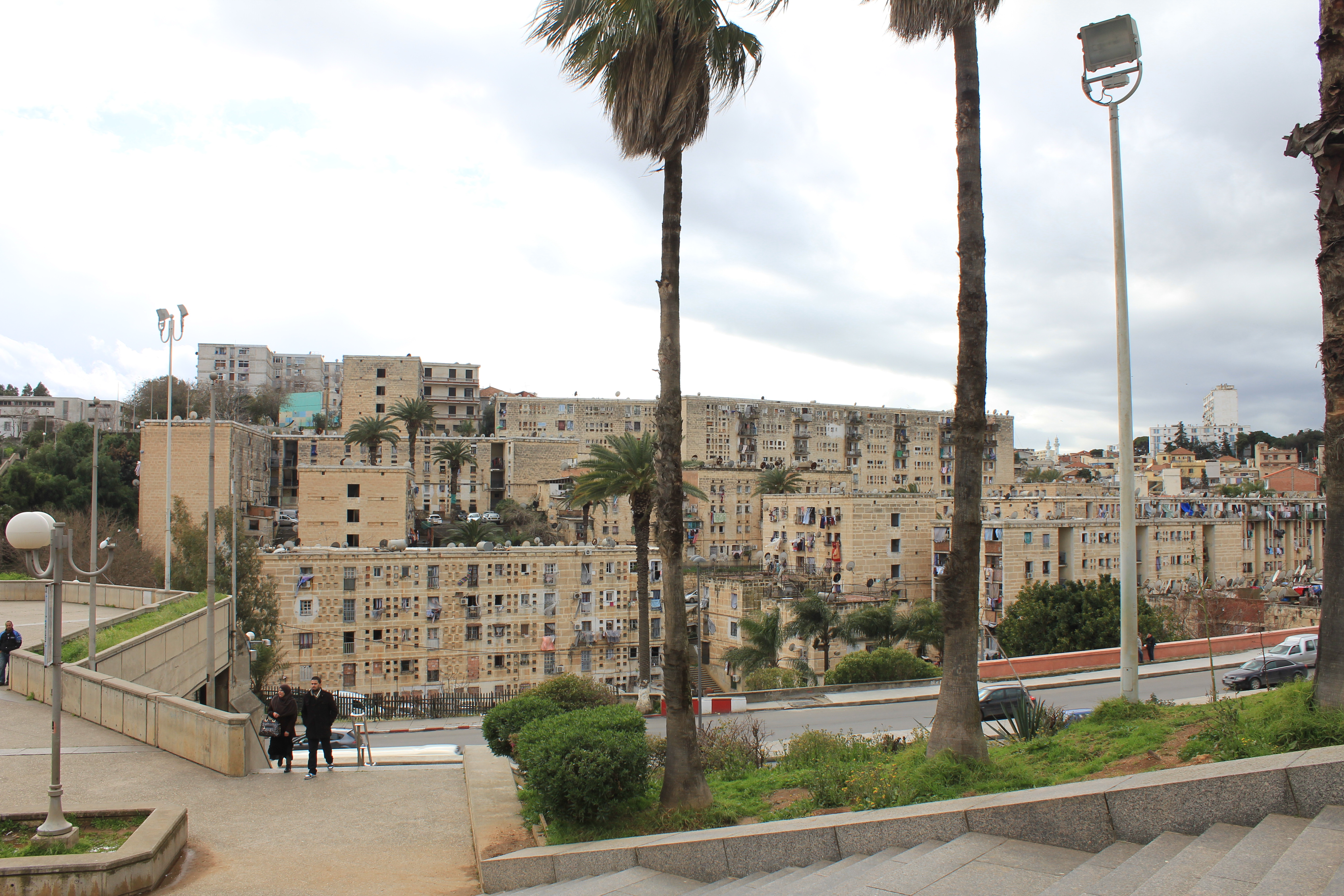
Stone apartment complex, Diar El Mahçoul, El Madania, Algeria

A medieval stonemason would often carve a personal symbol onto their block to differentiate their work from that of other stonemasons. This also provided a simple "quality assurance" system.

The Renaissance saw stonemasonry return to the ideals of the Classical age, the rise of humanist philosophy inspiring artisans to create works in the manner of ancient Greece and Rome. The centre stage for the Renaissance would prove to be Italy, where Italian city-states such as Florence erected great structures, including the Florence Cathedral, the Fountain of Neptune, and the Laurentian Library, which was planned and built by Michelangelo Buonarroti, a famous sculptor of the Renaissance.

When Europeans settled the Americas, they brought the stonemasonry techniques of their respective homelands with them. Settlers used what materials were available, and in some areas, stone was the material of choice. In the first waves, building mimicked that of Europe, to eventually be replaced by unique architecture later on.

In the 20th century, stonemasonry saw its most radical changes in the way the work is accomplished. Prior to the first half of the century, most heavy work was executed by draft animals or human muscle power. With the arrival of the internal combustion engine, many of these hard aspects of the trade have been made simpler and easier. Cranes and forklifts have made moving and laying heavy stones relatively easy for the stonemasons. Motor powered mortar mixers have saved much in time and energy as well. Compressed-air powered tools have made working of stone less time-intensive. Petrol and electric-powered abrasive saws can cut through stone much faster and with more precision than chiseling alone. Cemented carbide-tipped chisels can stand up to much more abuse than the steel and iron chisels made by blacksmiths of old.

== Tools ==
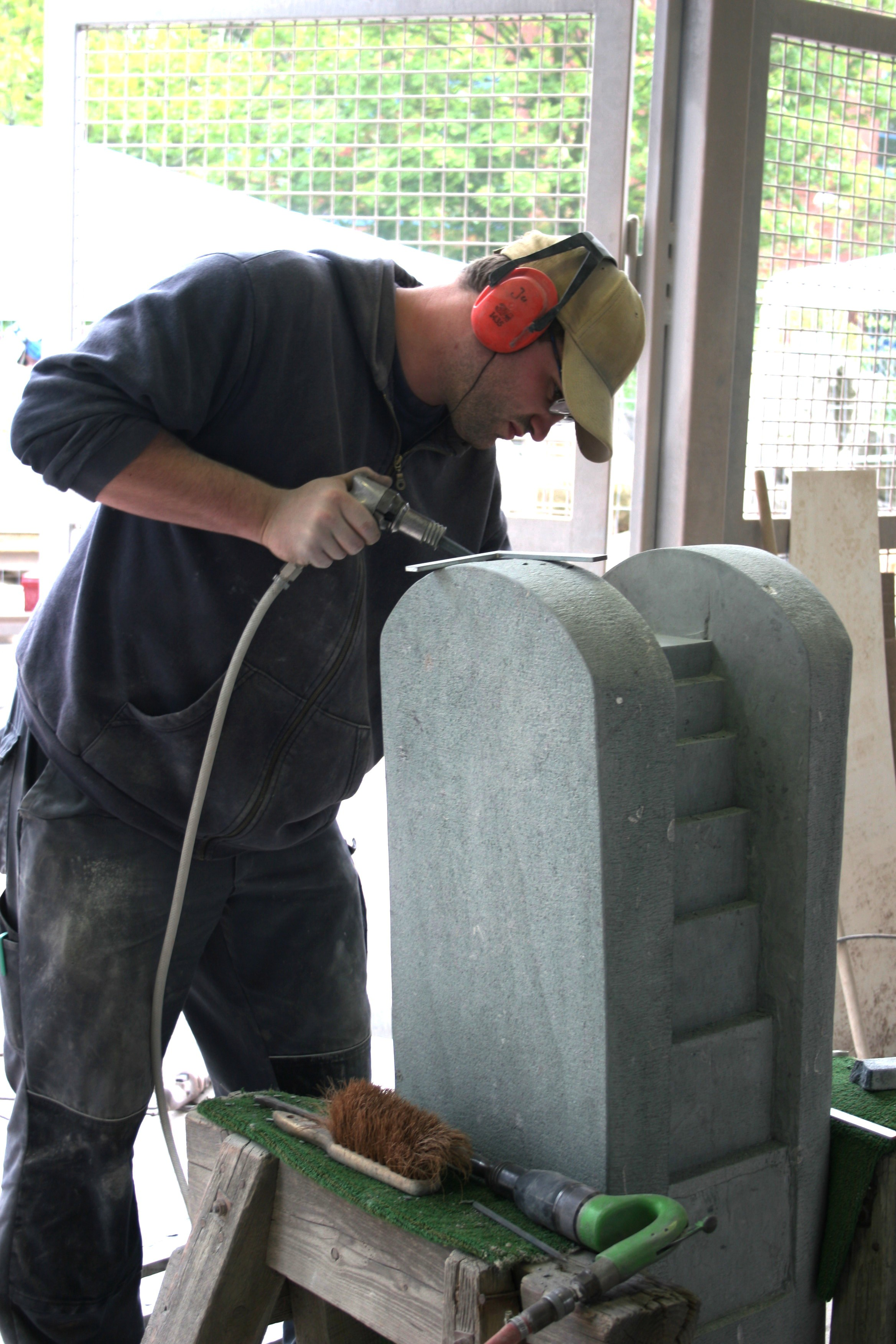
Stonemason dressing stone on a fountain with pneumatic tools

Stonemasons use a wide variety of tools to handle and shape stone blocks (ashlar) and slabs into finished articles. The basic tools for shaping the stone are a mallet, chisels, and a metal straight edge. With these one can make a flat surface – the basis of all stonemasonry.

Chisels come in a variety of sizes and shapes, dependent upon the function for which they are being used and have many different names depending on locality. There are different chisels for different materials and sizes of material being worked, for removing large amounts of material and for putting a fine finish on the stone. A drove chisel is used for smoothing off roughly finished stones.

Mixing mortar is normally done today with mortar mixers which usually use a rotating drum or rotating paddles to mix the mortar.

The masonry trowel is used for the application of the mortar between and around the stones as they are set into place. Filling in the gaps (joints) with mortar is referred to as pointing. Pointing in smaller joints can be accomplished using tuck pointers, pointing trowels, and margin trowels, among other tools.

A mason's hammer has a long thin head and is called a Punch Hammer. It would be used with a chisel or splitter for a variety of purposes

A walling hammer (catchy hammer) can be used in place of a hammer and chisel or pincher to produce rubble or pinnings or snecks.

Stonemasons use a lewis together with a crane or block and tackle to hoist building stones into place.

Today, power tools such as compressed-air chisels, abrasive spinners, and angle grinders are used; these save time and money, but are hazardous and require as much skill as the hand tools that they augment. Many of the basic tools of stonemasonry have remained nearly the same for up to thousands of years, for instance, when comparing chisels that can be bought today with chisels found at the pyramids of Giza the common sizes and shapes are virtually unchanged.

== Training ==
Stone sculpture of stonemasons at work, tabernacle of the Guild of Stone and Wood Masters, Orsanmichele Church

Traditionally medieval stonemasons served a seven-year apprenticeship. A similar system still operates today.

A modern apprenticeship lasts three years. This combines on-site learning through personal experience, the experience of the tradesmen, and college work where apprentices are given an overall experience of the building, hewing and theory work involved in masonry. In some areas, colleges offer courses which teach not only the manual skills but also related fields such as drafting and blueprint reading or construction conservation. Electronic Stonemasonry training resources enhance traditional delivery techniques. Hands-on workshops are a good way to learn about stonemasonry also. Those wishing to become stonemasons should have little problem working at heights, possess reasonable hand-eye coordination, be moderately physically fit, and have basic mathematical ability. Most of these things can be developed while learning.

The modern stonemason undergoes comprehensive training, both in the classroom and in the working environment. Hands-on skill is complemented by an intimate knowledge of each stone type, its application, and best uses, and how to work and fix each stone in place. The mason may be trained in one or all branches of stonemasonry.

== Types of stone ==
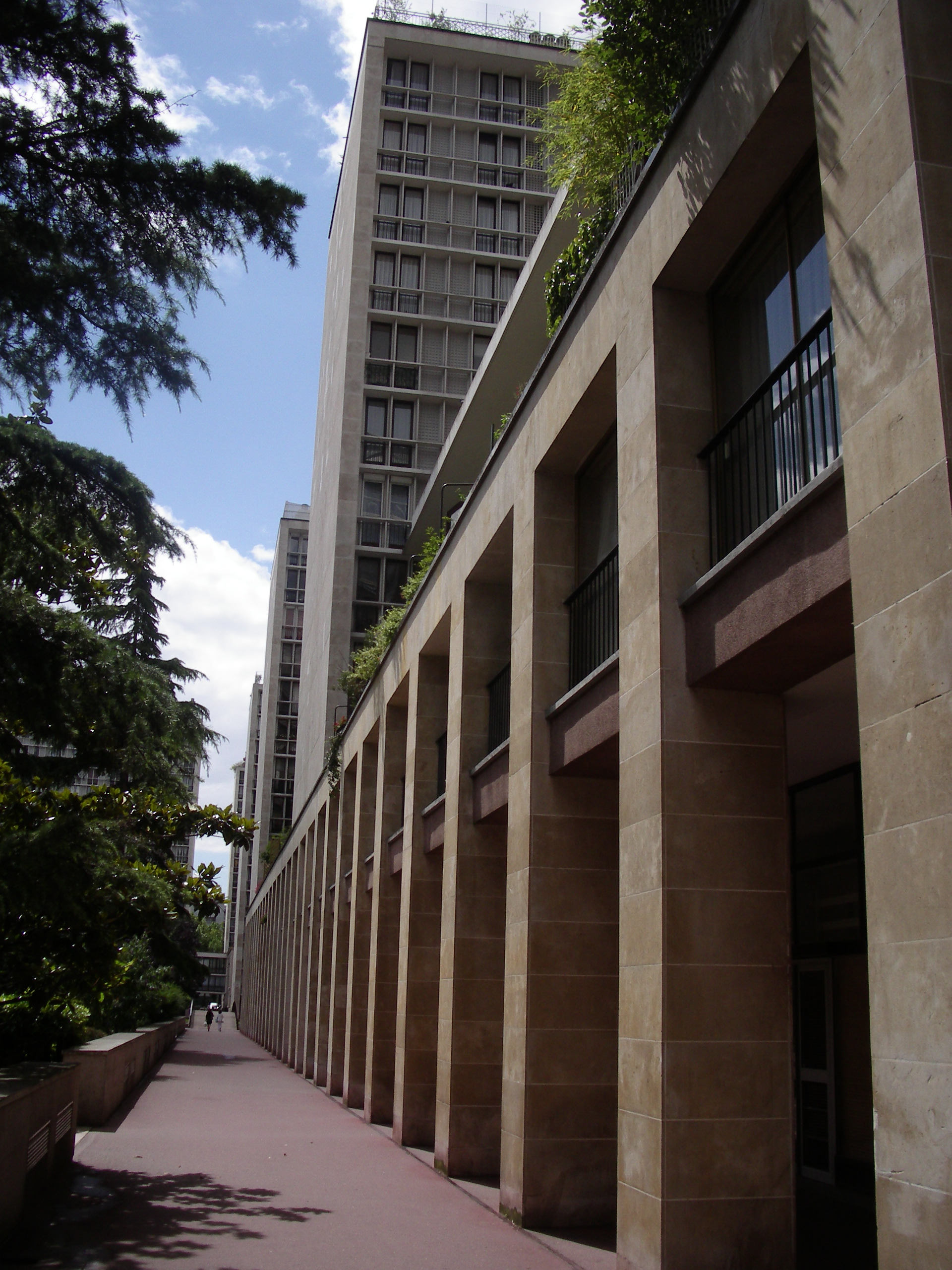
Part of a Fernand Pouillon residential complex constructed from massive blocks of sedimentary limestone

Stonemasons use all types of natural stone: igneous, metamorphic and sedimentary; while some also use artificial stone as well.

=== Igneous stones ===
- Granite is one of the hardest stones, and requires such different techniques to sedimentary stones that it is virtually a separate trade. With great persistence, simple mouldings can and have been carved from granite, for example in many Cornish churches and in the city of Aberdeen. Generally, however, it is used for purposes that require its strength and durability, such as kerbstones, countertops, flooring, and breakwaters.
- Igneous stone ranges from very soft rocks such as pumice and scoria to somewhat harder rocks such as tuff to the hardest rocks such as granite and basalt.

=== Metamorphic ===
- Marble is a fine, easily worked stone, that comes in various colours, but mainly white. It has traditionally been used for carving statues, and for facings of many Byzantine and Italian Renaissance buildings. Prominent Greek sculptors, such as Antenor (6th century BC), Phidias and Critias (5th century BC), Praxiteles (4th century BC) and others used mainly the marble of Paros and Thassos islands, and the whitest and brightest of all (although not the finest), the Pentelikon marble. Their work was preceded by older sculptors from Mesopotamia and Egypt, but the Greeks were unmatched in plasticity and realistic (re)presentation, either of Gods (Apollo, Aphrodite, Hermes, Zeus, etc.), or humans (Pythagoras, Socrates, Plato, Phryne, etc.). The famous Acropolis of Athens is said to be constructed using the Pentelicon marble. The traditional home of the marble industry is the area around Carrara in Italy, from where a bright and fine, whitish marble is extracted in vast quantities.
- Slate is a popular choice of stone for memorials and inscriptions, as its fine grain and hardness means it leaves details very sharp. Its tendency to split into thin plates has also made it a popular roofing material.

=== Sedimentary ===
Many of the world's most famous buildings have been built of sedimentary stone, from Durham Cathedral to St Peter's in Rome. There are two main types of sedimentary stone used in masonry work, limestones and sandstones. Examples of limestones include Bath and Portland stone. Yorkstone and Sydney sandstone are the most commonly used sandstone.

== Gallery ==
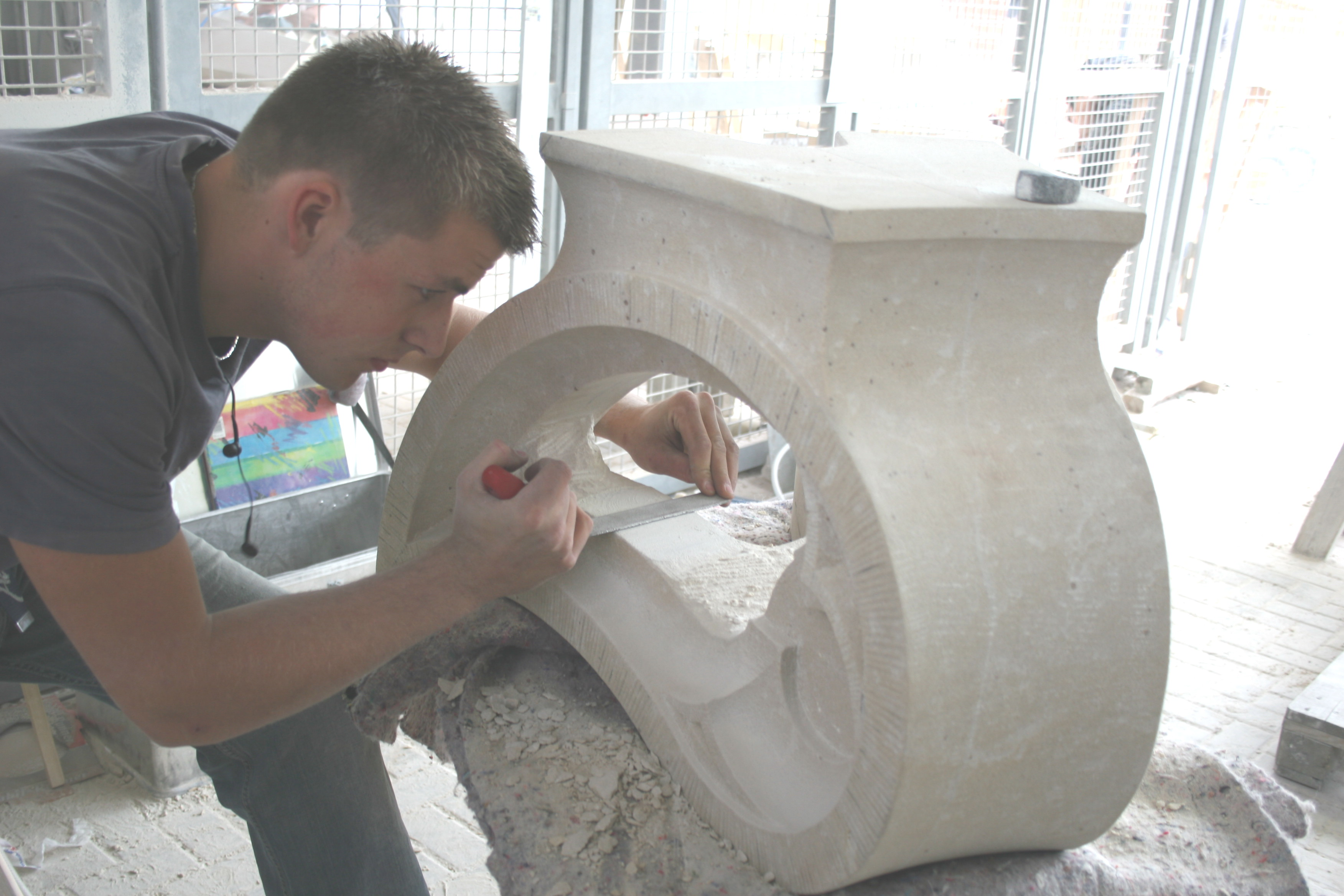
An apprentice carving a block

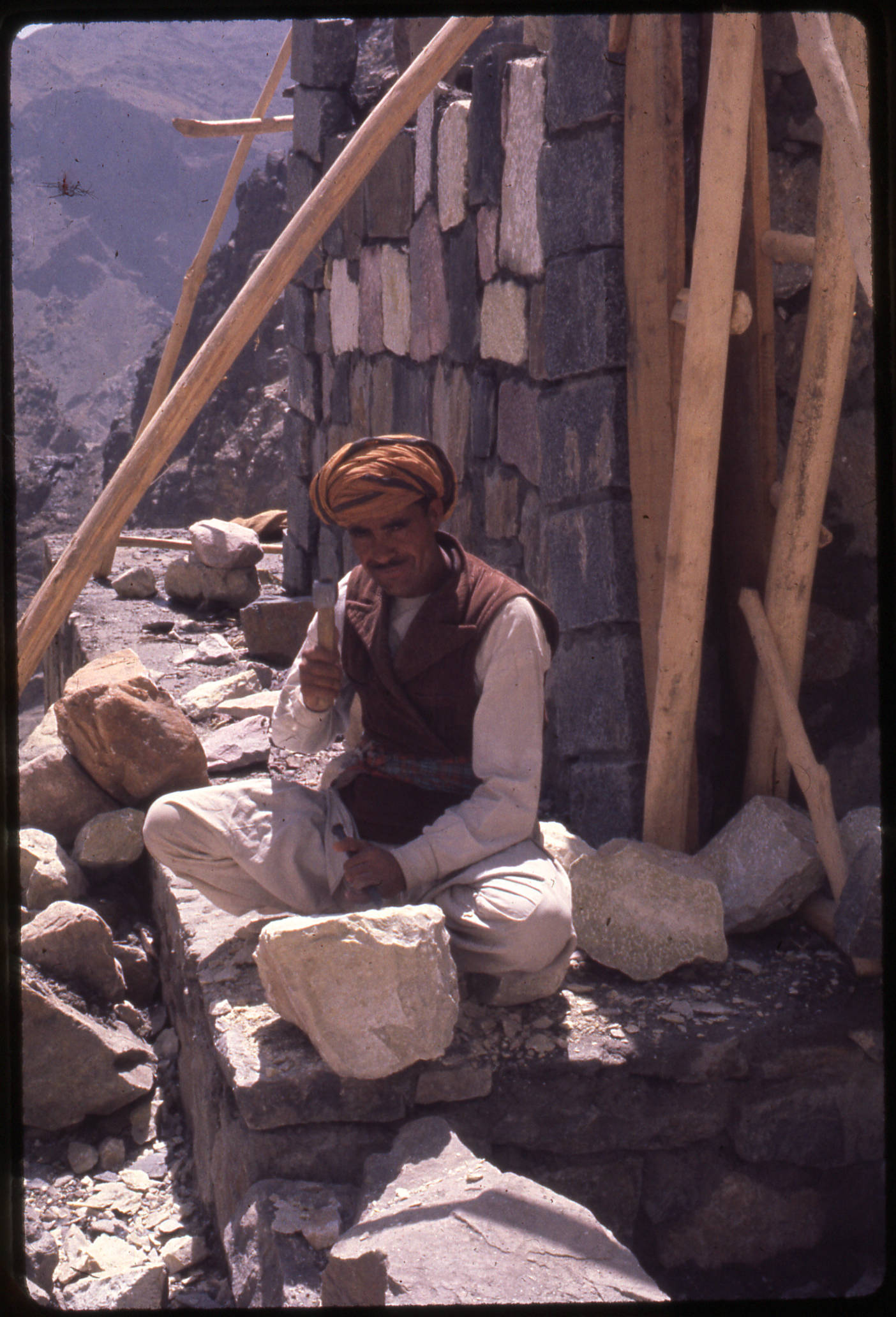
Stonemason at the construction of the Kabul-Kandahar Highway in Afghanistan, 1961

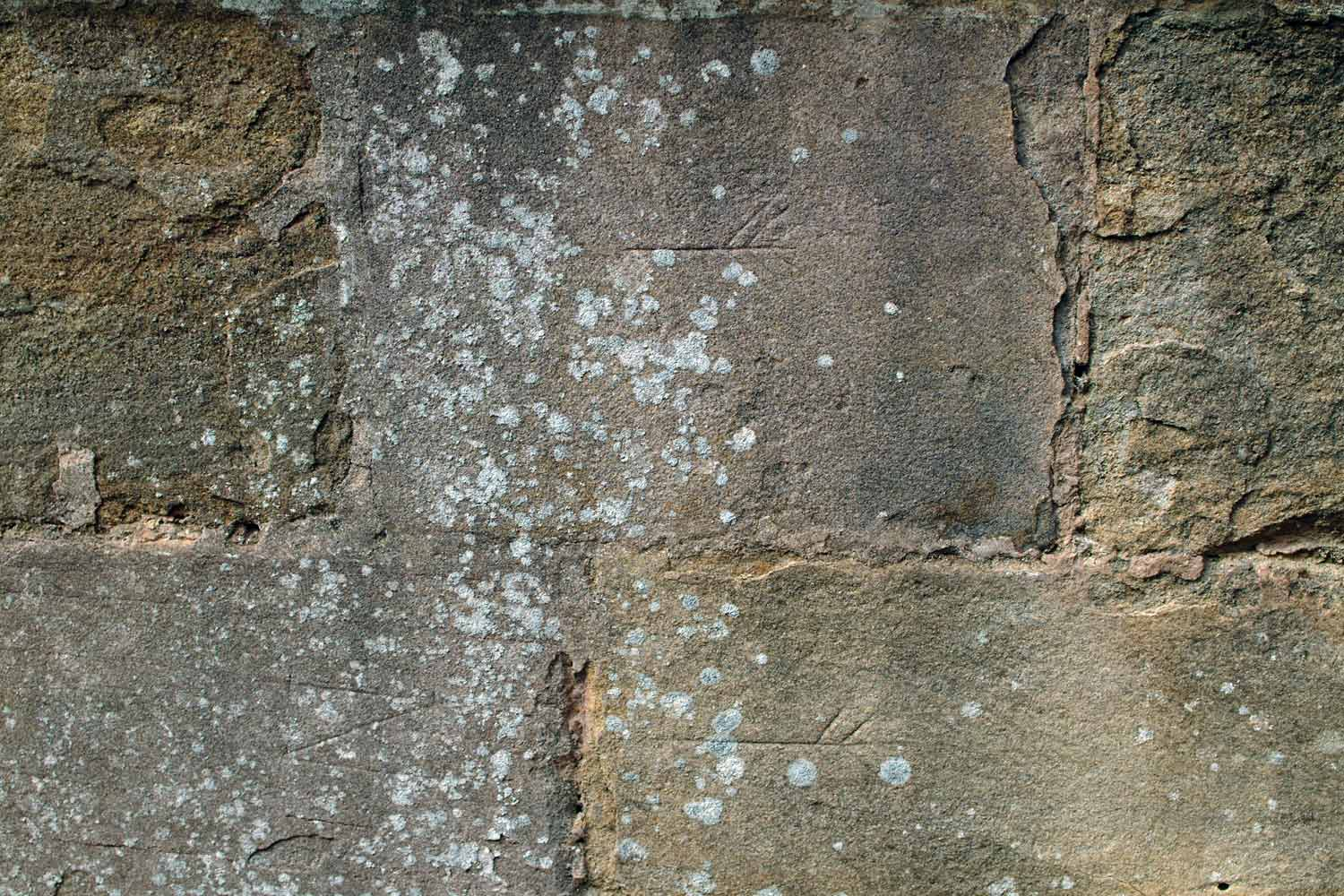
Three different stonemason's marks, which can be seen in the Chapter House of Fountains Abbey

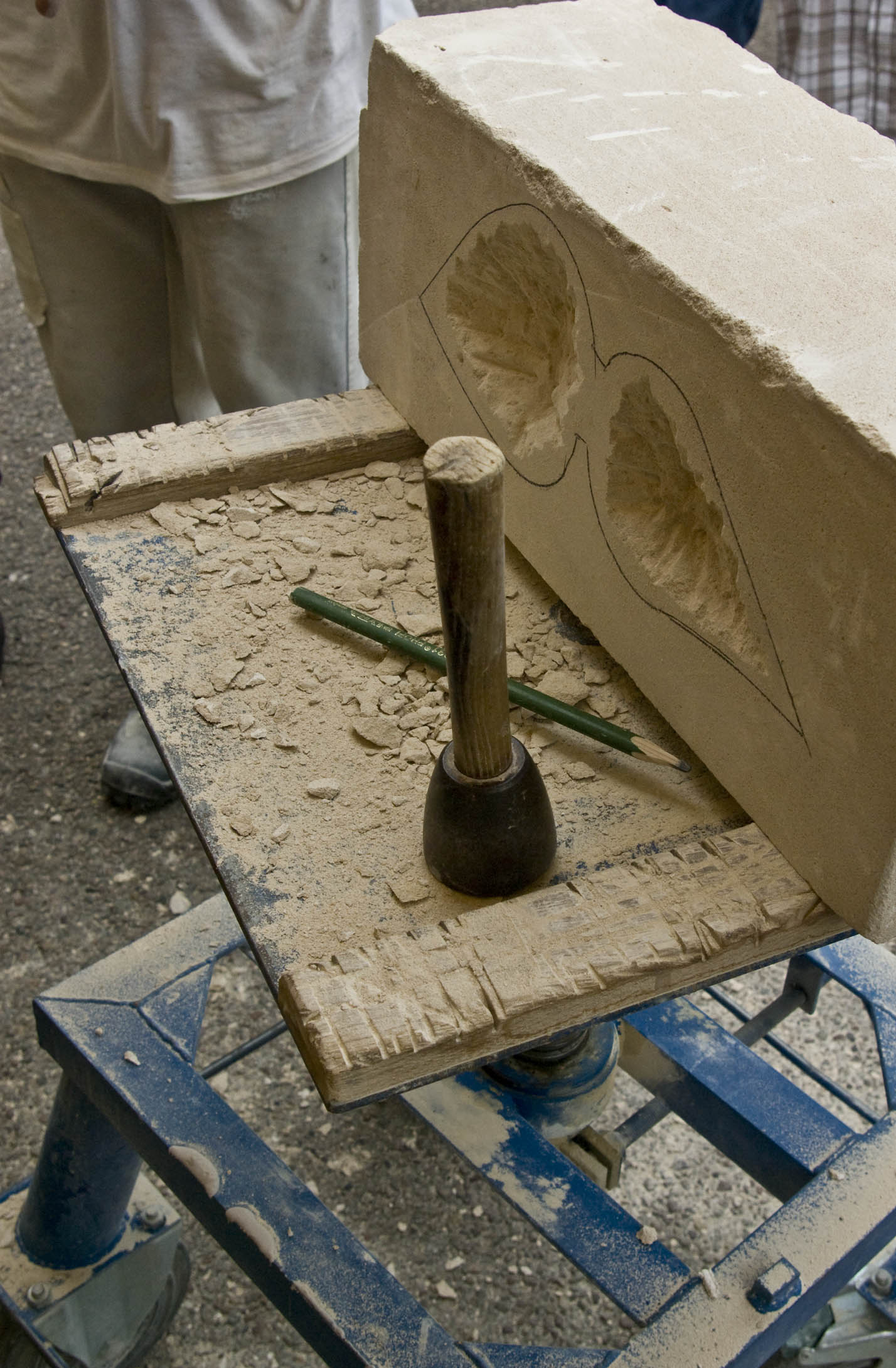
A modern stonemason's workbench with a block of limestone

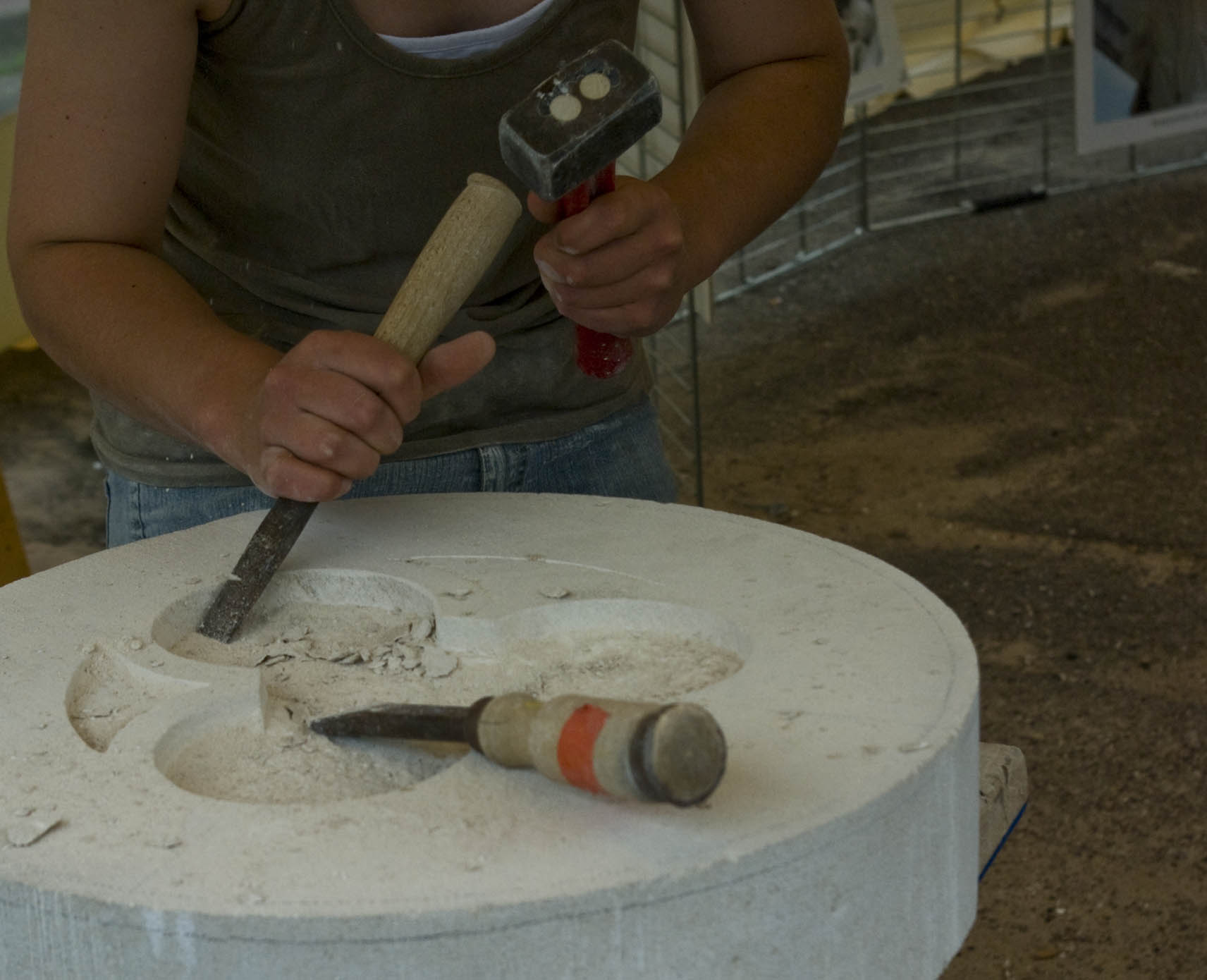
Typical French chisels with wooden hilt, used for soft limestone

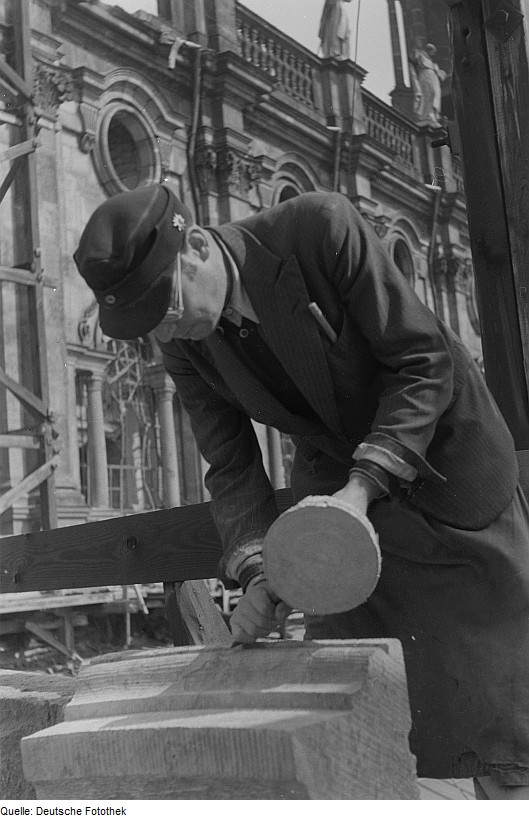
A left-handed stonemason with mallet and chisel

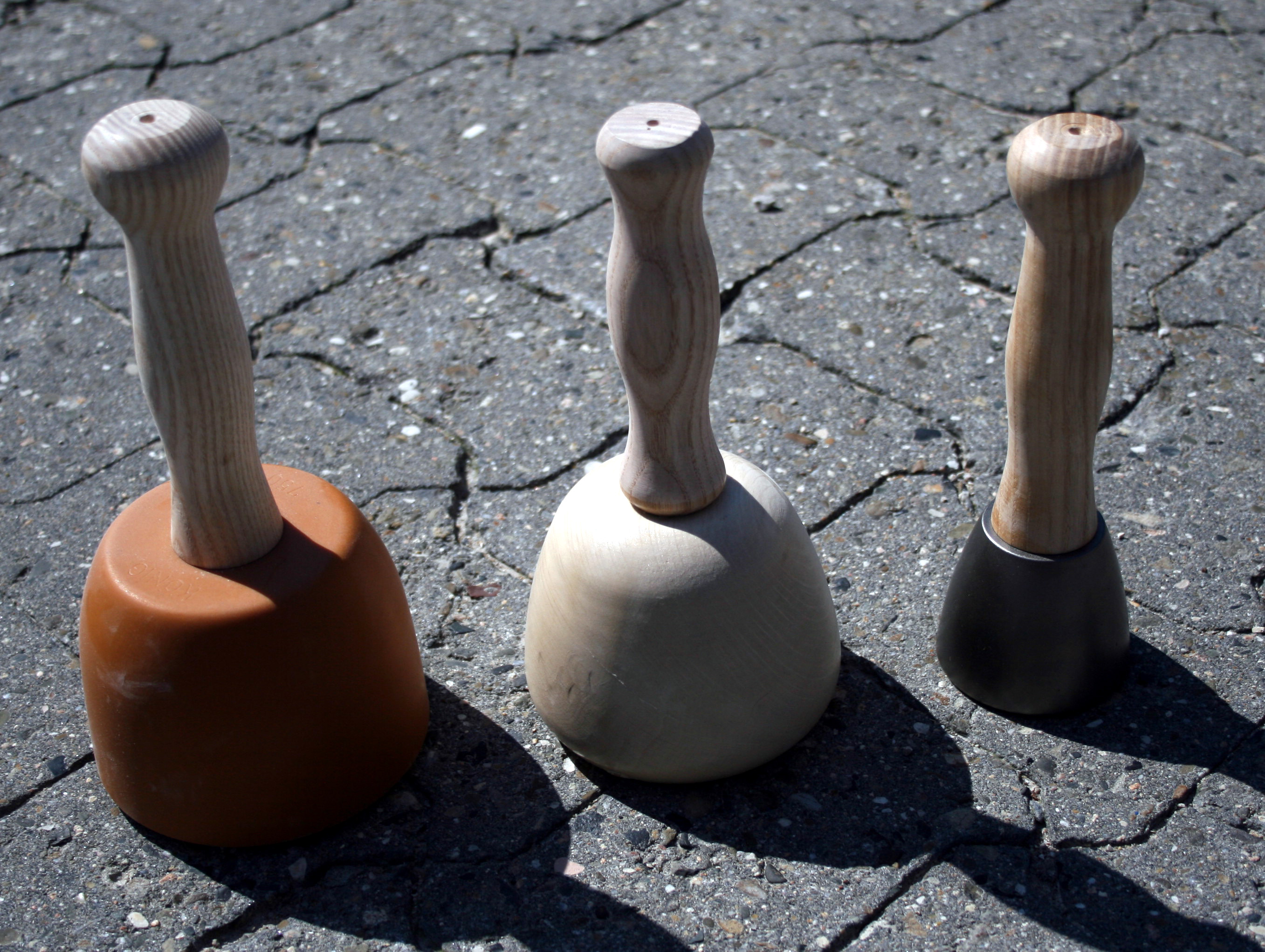
Stonemason's mallets of plastic, beechwood and steel

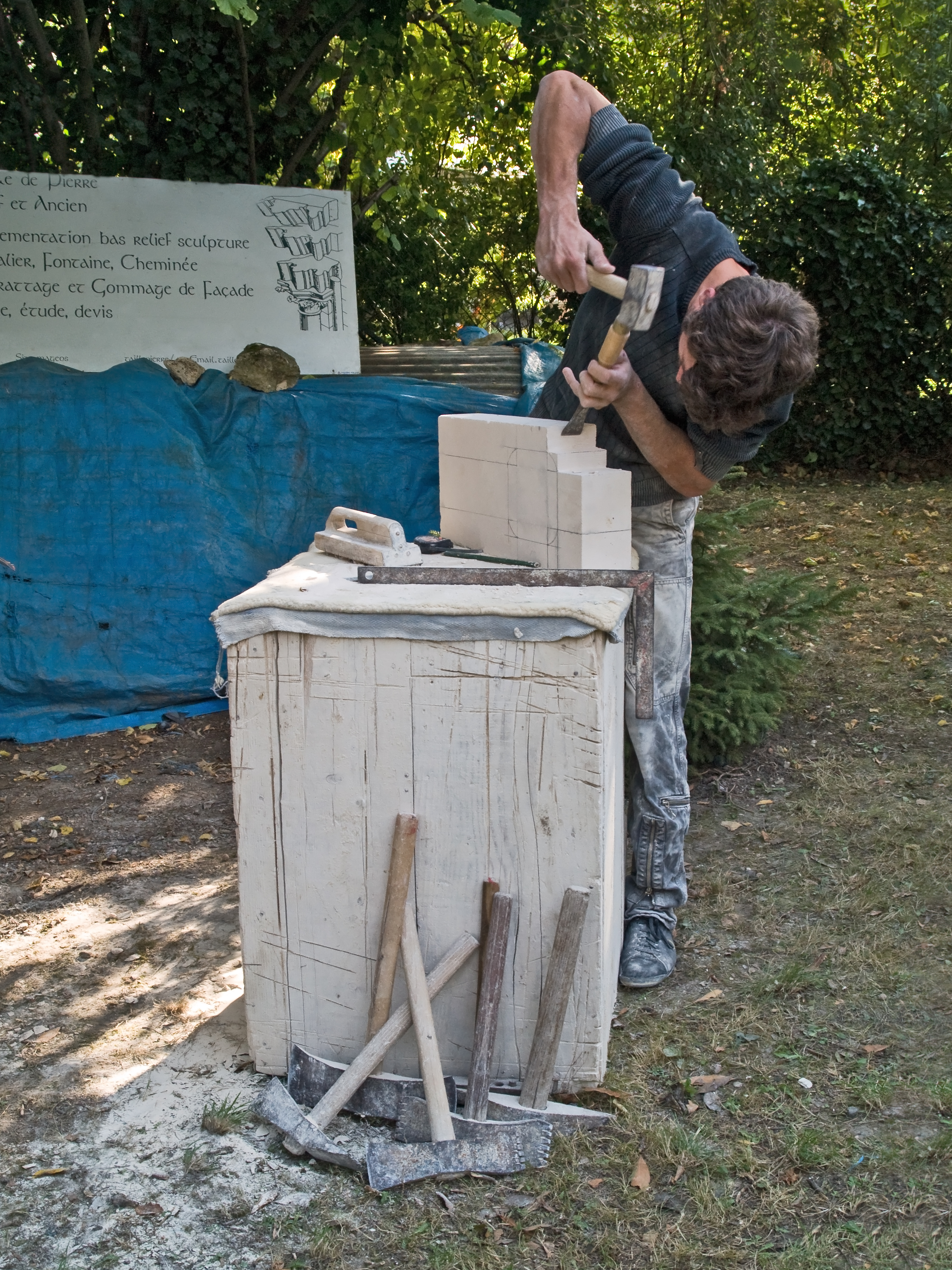
A stonemason and his tools

== See also ==
- Ashlar, cut and dressed stone, usually rectangular
- Bossage: uncut stone is laid in place with outward projection, which is later carved into shape.
- Bossed masonry, ancient technique where ashlars have a protruding central surface (the "boss") surrounded by smooth, sunken margins
- Rustication (architecture), techniques giving visible surfaces a rough or patterned surface

- The Stonemason – 2020 non-fiction book by Andrew Ziminski
- Stone carving – Act of shaping stone materials
- Stone sculpture – Sculpture made from stone
- Stone wall – Masonry structural division
- Slipform stonemasonry
- Bricklayer – Person who lays brick
- Masonry – Building of structures from individual units of stone, bricks, or blocks
- Architecture – Art and technique of designing buildings
- Palatine Stonemason Museum – Museum in the village of Alsenz, Germany

Categories:

- Stonemasonry tools
