= Slipform stonemasonry =

Slipform stonemasonry is a method for making a reinforced concrete wall with stone facing. In slipform stonemasonry stones and mortar are built up in courses within reusable slipforms. It is a cross between traditional mortared stone wall and a veneered stone wall. Short forms, up to 60 cm high, are placed on both sides of the wall to serve as a guide for the stone work. The stones are placed inside the forms with the good faces against the form work. Concrete is poured in behind the rocks. Rebar is added for strength, to make a wall that is approximately half reinforced concrete and half stonework. The wall can be faced with stone on one side or both sides. After the concrete sets enough to hold the wall together, the forms are "slipped" up to pour the next level. With slipforms it is easy for a novice to build free-standing stone walls.

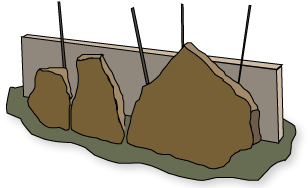
Slipform stone with rebar ready for concrete

== History ==
Slipform stonemasonry was developed by New York architect Ernest Flagg in 1920. Flagg built a vertical framework as tall as the wall, then inserted 2x6 or 2x8 planks as forms to guide the stonework. When the masonry work reached the top of a plank, Flagg inserted another one, adding more planks until he reached the top of the wall. Helen and Scott Nearing modified the technique in Vermont in the 1930s, using slipforms that were slipped up the wall.

== Gallery ==
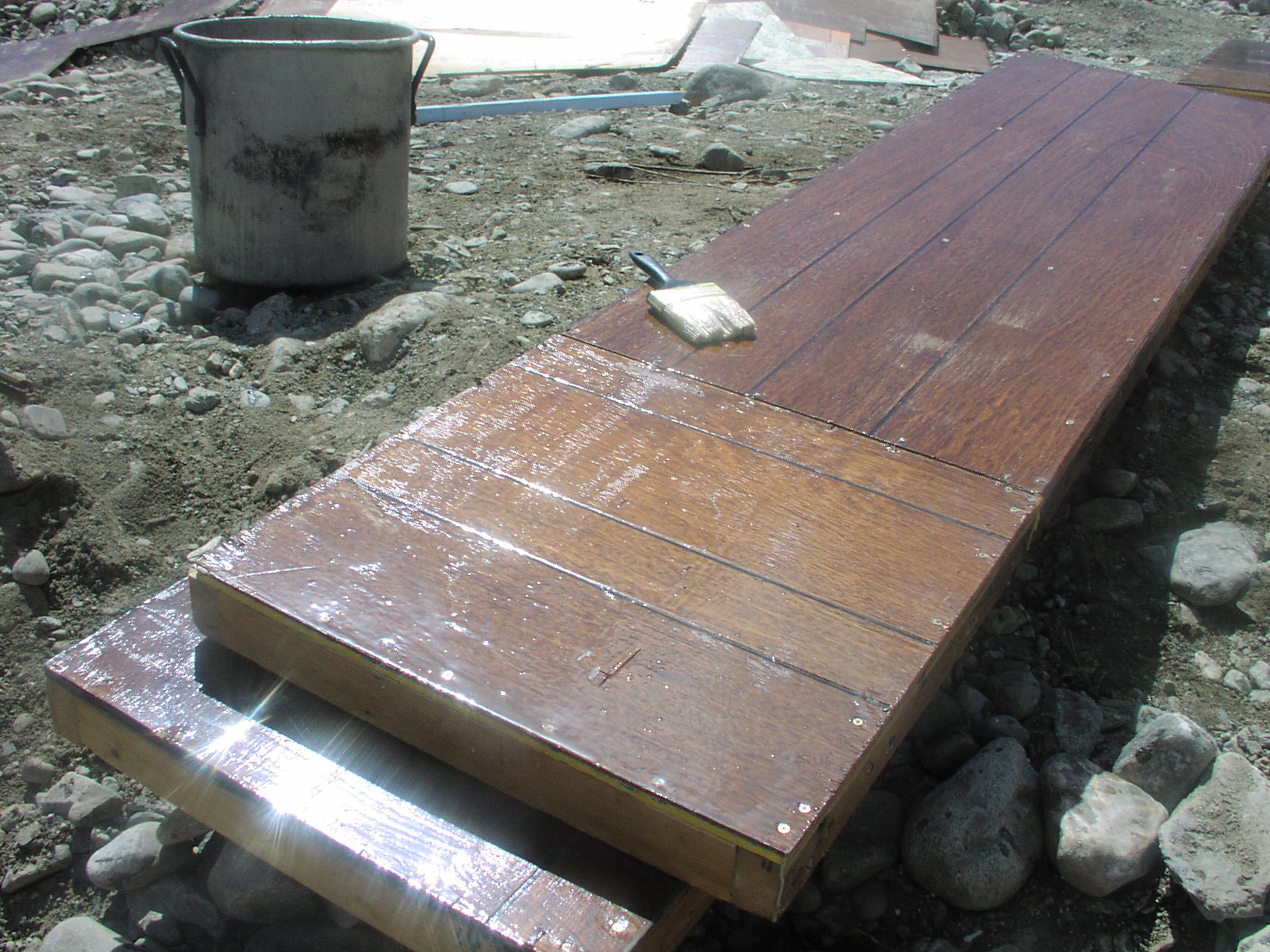
Slipforms oiled to prevent concrete from sticking to the wood.

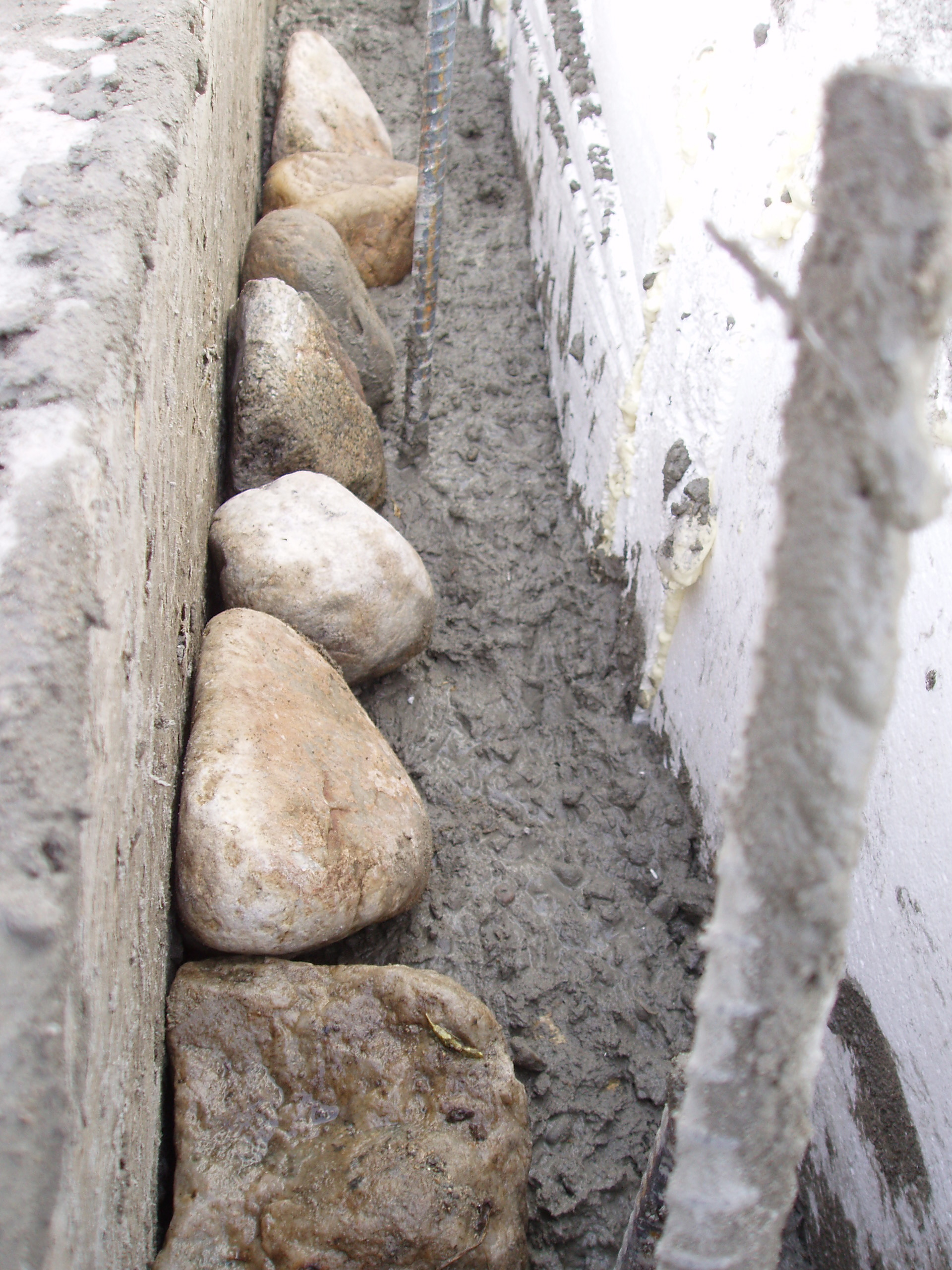
Placing stones inside the forms.

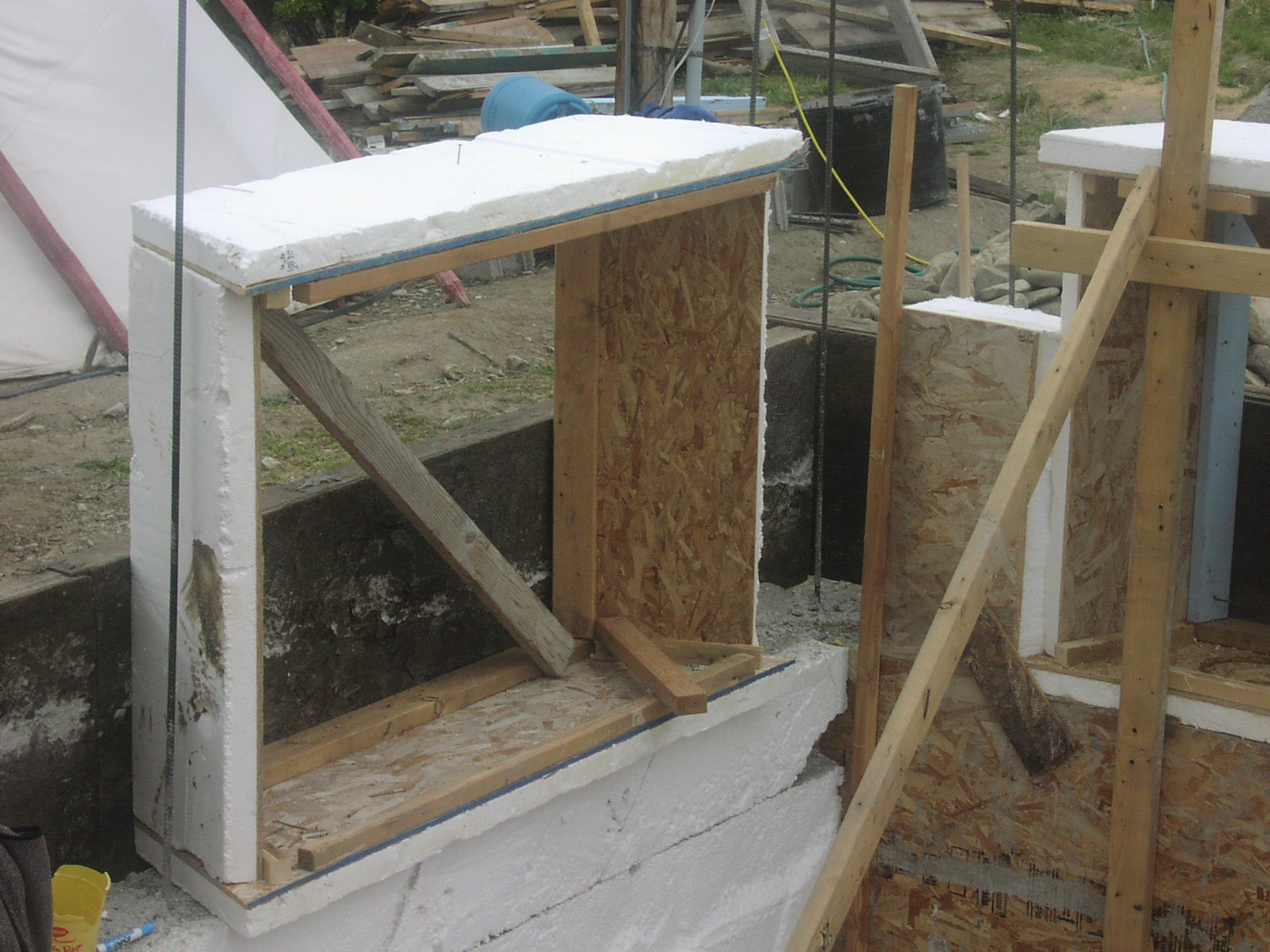
Window frames are placed in the forms.

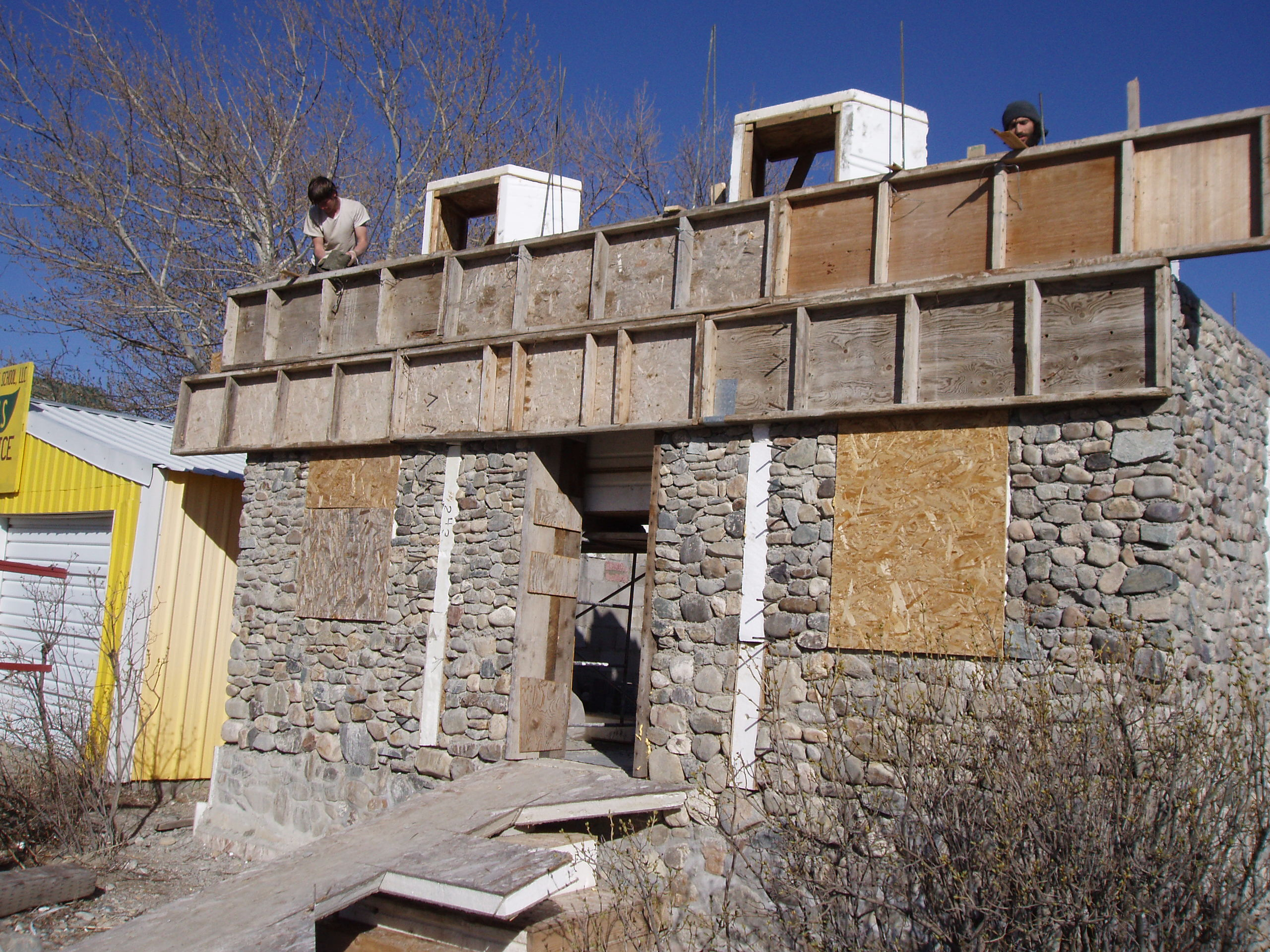
Slipforms are leap-frogged up the wall.

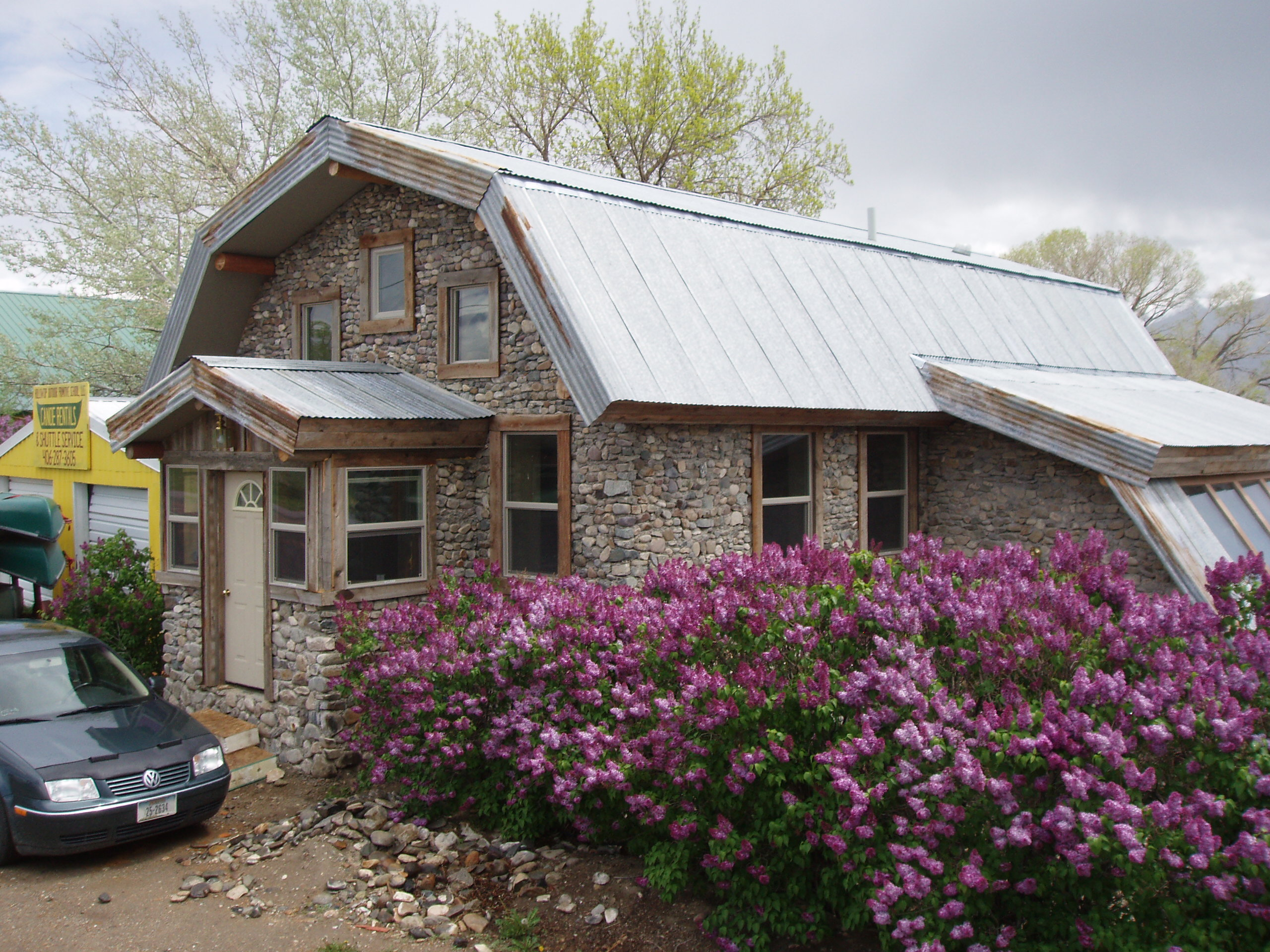
A finished slipform stone house.

== Notes ==
The diagram of the slipform wall section is completely misleading without showing the 2nd form.
