= Fernand Pouillon =

French architect

- Born: 14 May 1912; Cancon, Lot-et-Garonne, France
- Died: 24 July 1986 (aged 74); Belcastel, Aveyron, France
- Occupation: Architect
- Buildings: Usine Nestle, factory, Marseille, 1948. Reconstruction of the Old Port of Marseille, France, 1949-53. La Tourette, housing complex, Marseille, France 1949-53. University Library, Aix-en-Provence, France, 1952. Diar es Saada and Diar el Mahçoul, New towns, including 6,900 apartments, Algeria, 1953-57. Climat de France, New town, including 3,500 apartments, Algeria 1953-57. Housing project Buffalo, 550 apartments, Montrouge, France 1955-62. Housing project in Pantin, 350 apartments, Pantin, France, 1955-62. Le Point du Jour housing complex, 2,200 apartments, Boulogne Billancourt, France, 1955-62. Tourism complex, 2000 beds, Tipaza, Algeria, 1968. Restoration of Château de Belcastel, Aveyron, France, 1975-83.

Fernand Pouillon (14 May 1912 – 24 July 1986) was a French architect, urban planner, building contractor and writer.

Pouillon was one of the most active and influential post-World War II architects and builders in France. He is remembered for his use of ‘noble’ building materials like stone, his integration of all phases of the building process, his inexpensive and efficient building techniques and his harmonious juxtaposition of forms. He was a humanist, as well as an architect.^{:6} His stated goal was to meet human needs, and especially, those of middle-class and poorer families who faced severe shortages of adequate housing in the post-War period.^{:16}

Due to his success and personality, he attracted the jealousy and ill-will of many. His life included time in and escape from prison. Some architectural critics have speculated that he will be remembered as one of the great French architects of the 20th century.

In 2025, Bloomberg News showcased Pouillon's architectural work, especially the post-World War II housing estates in the Old Port of Marseille, where the historic urban fabric had been destroyed. Bloomberg News summarizes Pouillon as "an architect, painter, communist, novelist and convicted fraudster".

== Early life, early career and architecture degree ==
Pouillon was born 14 May 1912 in Cancon, Lot-et-Garonne, the son of Alexis Pouillon, a civil engineer and entrepreneur. The family was in this region because Alexis Pouillon was working on a railroad project. The family moved back to Marseille in 1919.^{:206}

At the age of 15, Pouillon attended the School of Beaux-Arts of Marseille, where, for one year, he studied drawing, sculpture and architecture (he did not obtain an official architecture degree until the Vichy period). He then moved to Paris, where he worked on both the construction and commercial sides of the building sector for several years. At the age of 22, he built his first project (le Palais Albert I) in Aix-en-Provence (at the time, an architecture degree was not required for such a role).

This prolonged, ‘hands-on’ contact with all facets of the construction process differentiated Pouillon from many of his contemporaries, whose approach to architecture was more academic and not focused on construction techniques.

Pouillon fought as a volunteer in the defence of France from 1939 until 16 July 1940 (he was not mobilised because of ill health). The World War II period of German occupation proved to be a calm one for the building trades in France. During this time, Pouillon supported his family by doing small projects and by selling antiques. He also used this lull in construction activity to earn his architectural degree between 1941 and 1942.^{:206}

== The immediate post-War period ==
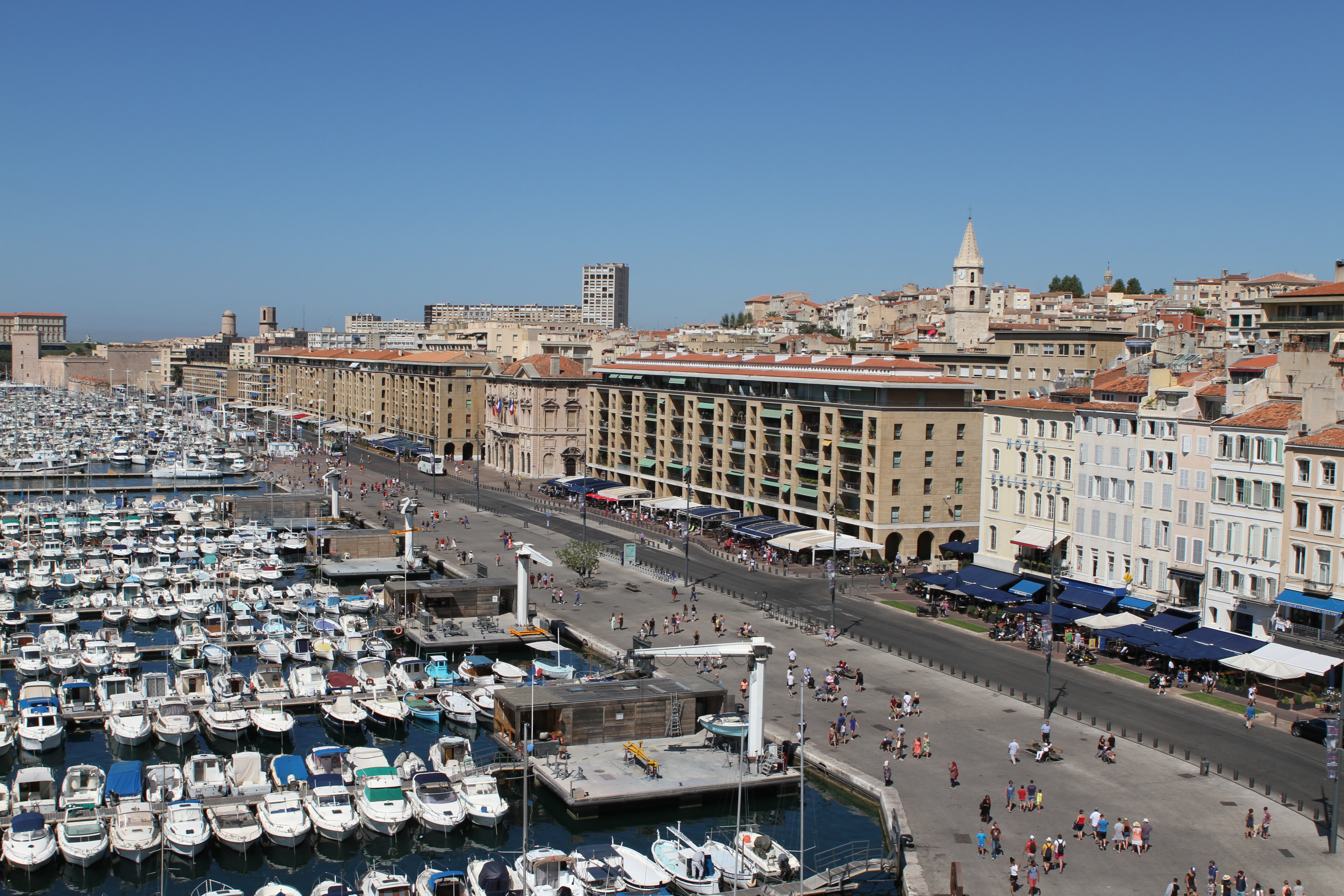
The Vieux Port of Marseille. Pouillon built the modern buildings seen to the right of the port.

Due to damage from the War and rapid economic and population growth, post-War France had a pressing need for housing and infrastructure development. In Marseille, in particular, a whole quartier in the Old Port (Vieux Port) had been destroyed in 1943. The initial phases of the reconstruction process were chaotic. The tensions among the various actors (ministries and other government agencies, competing architects, construction companies and the citizens whose dwellings had been destroyed) reflected differing views on design and aesthetics, cost control and deadlines, as well as professional rivalries.

Pouillon was an architect who could answer the call to ‘build fast, build cheaply and build well.’ He started with centres for refugees and prisoners of war — projects with very short deadlines. For the reconstruction of the Vieux Port (1949-1953), Pouillon's designs replaced, rather belatedly, those of another, better known architect, André Leconte. Leconte's designs had originally been selected for the redevelopment project, and construction had already begun. But influential people (the Minister of Reconstruction and Urbanism and the Mayor of Marseille) were starting to have doubts about his project.^{:13-14} After a struggle, Pouillon and another architect (André Devin) were asked to take over the project under the supervision of August Perret. Perret was named Chief Architect of the reconstruction process because it was thought that his authority and stature would calm tensions. This disagreement between Leconte and Pouillon was to be the first of many that pitted Pouillon against some of the major architects of his time.^{:47}

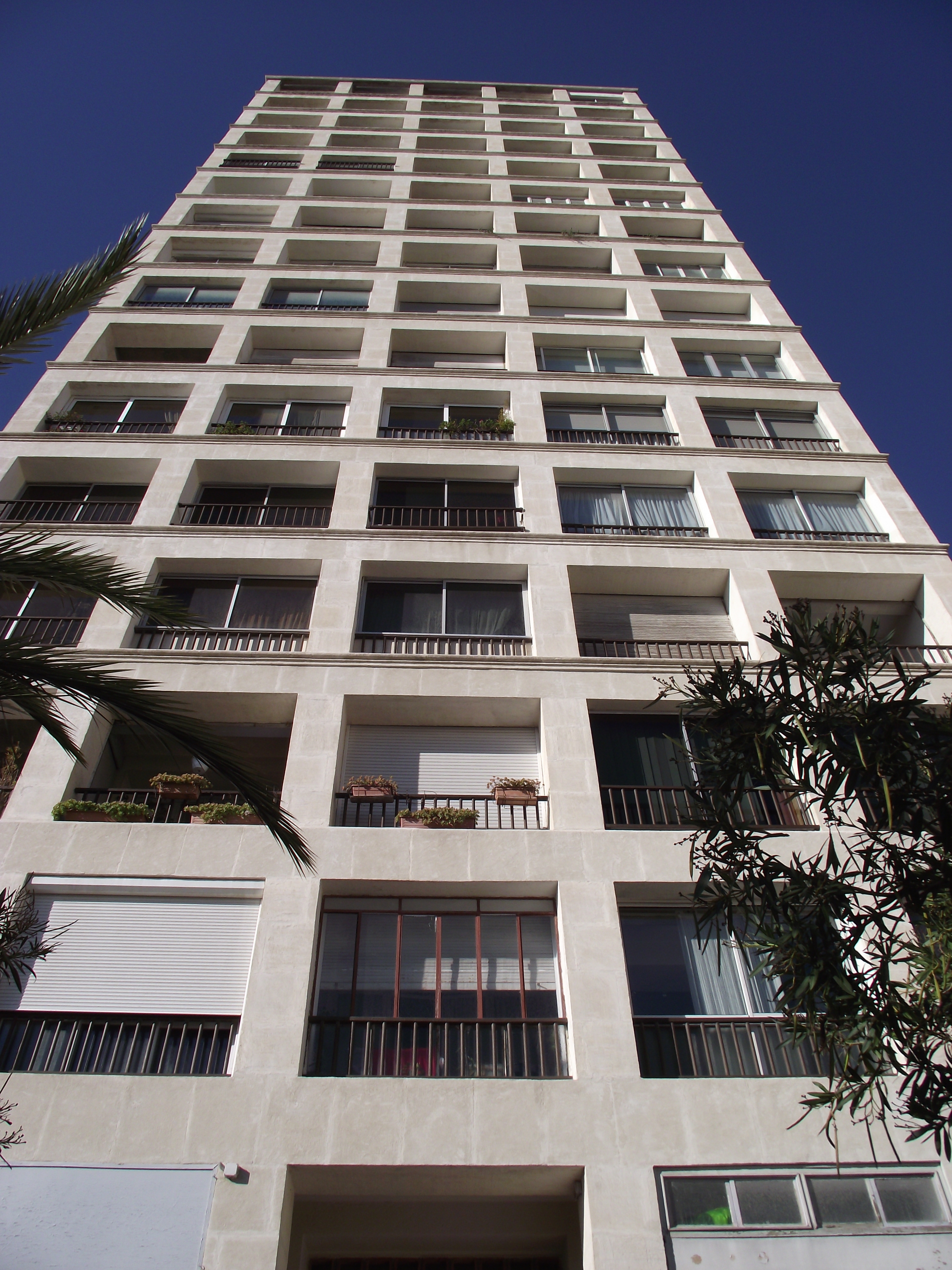
A residential building in the La Tourette renovation project, 2 Rue Saint-Laurent, 13002, Marseille. Constructed 1948-1953.

Another urban renewal project in Marseille — la Tourette, overlooking the Vieux Port (1948-1953) — made Pouillon’s reputation as an architect who could build beautiful buildings and neighbourhoods, rapidly and cheaply. This project was the platform from which Pouillon’s career was launched.

During this time, Pouillon perfected, along with his partners in the building trades, a construction system based largely on natural materials and close coordination between builders, artisans and artists. The system involved designs that (in addition to responding to human wants and needs) could be efficiently built using materials and technical components that had been standardised in advance with project suppliers. He also developed and used a ‘co-ordinating office’ charged with project design and with regulating the activities of the various actors on the construction site. His architecture firm was technically proficient in construction (which was unusual at the time) and capable of managing a project from conception to commercialisation.^{:59}

== Success, prison and exile ==
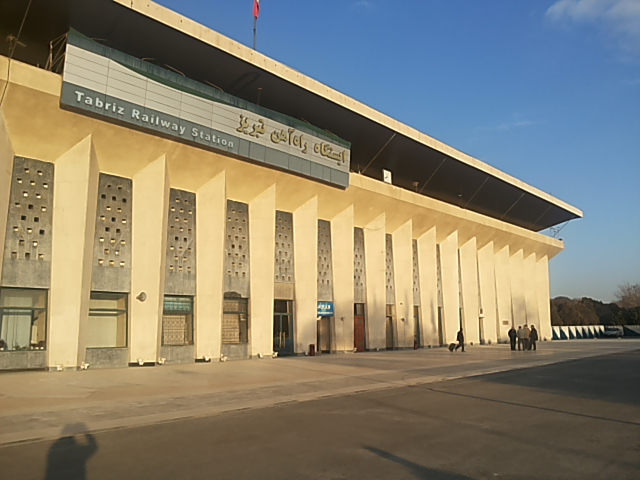
Tabriz Railway Station, Iran. 1950s. Designed in partnership with Heyder-Ghiai Chamlou.

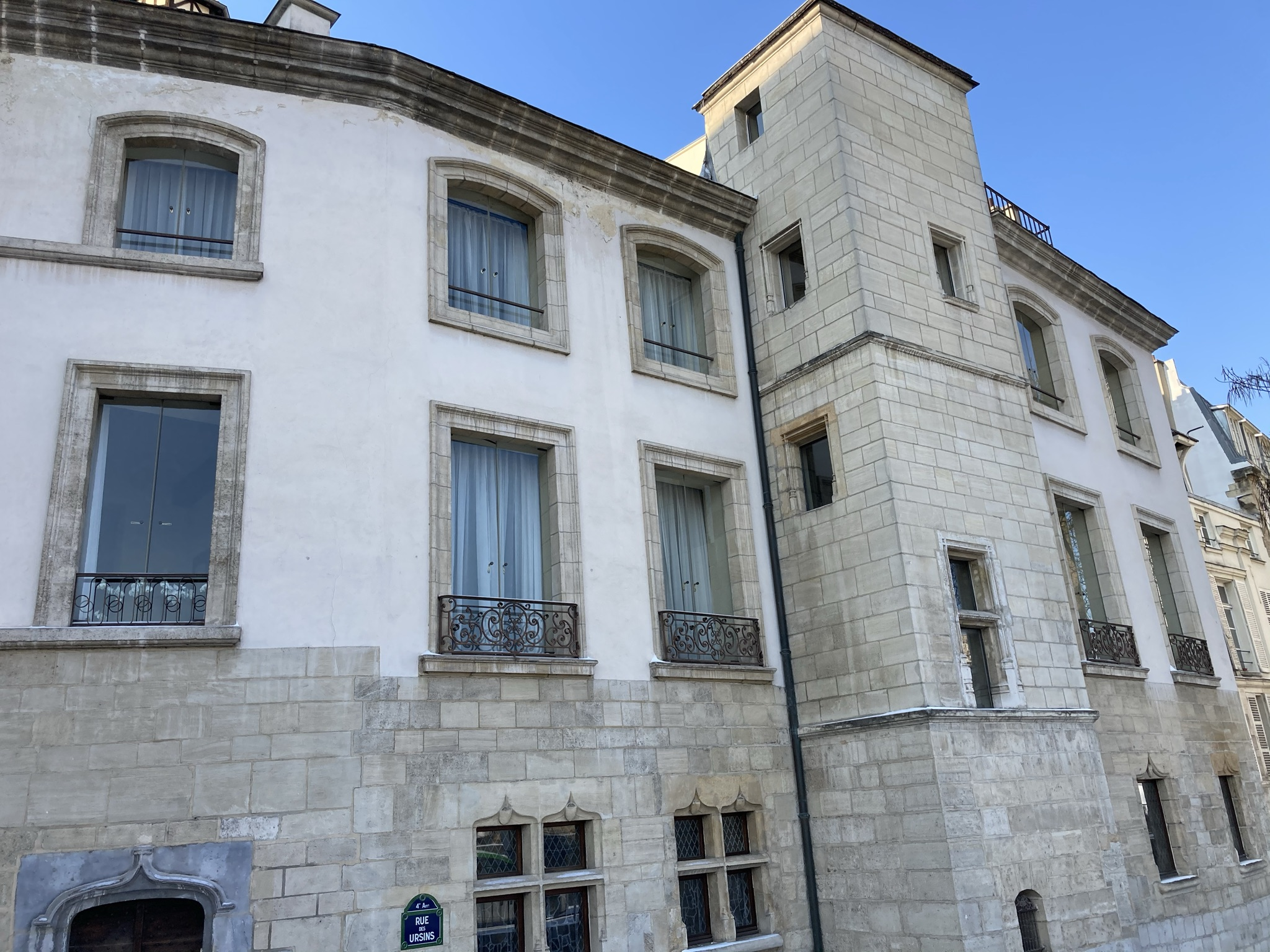
Pouillon’s mansion on the Île de la Cité in Paris

In the early and mid-1950s, Pouillon’s architectural practice was booming, with numerous projects in France, Algeria, and Iran. His firms employed dozens of architects. He earned a great deal of money and showed it—at one point, he owned a Bentley, an Alfa Romeo, two chateaux, a house in Algiers, a mansion in Paris and a yacht.^{:9}

At that time, Pouillon's practice came to be increasingly based in Paris, where, over the 1955-1962 period, he embarked on a number of huge housing projects in the Parisian suburbs: Pantin, Montrouge, Meudon and Boulogne-Billancourt.

These were exceptional projects, creating thousands of (often lower-income) apartments, built with stone and featuring such amenities as courtyards, water features, gardens and art work. In pursuing these projects, Pouillon tended to adopt the same mix of roles he knew from his early career (e.g, he was both project architect, builder and developer). This, however, violated what were recently developed professional ethics in France, as it was thought to create conflicts of interest.

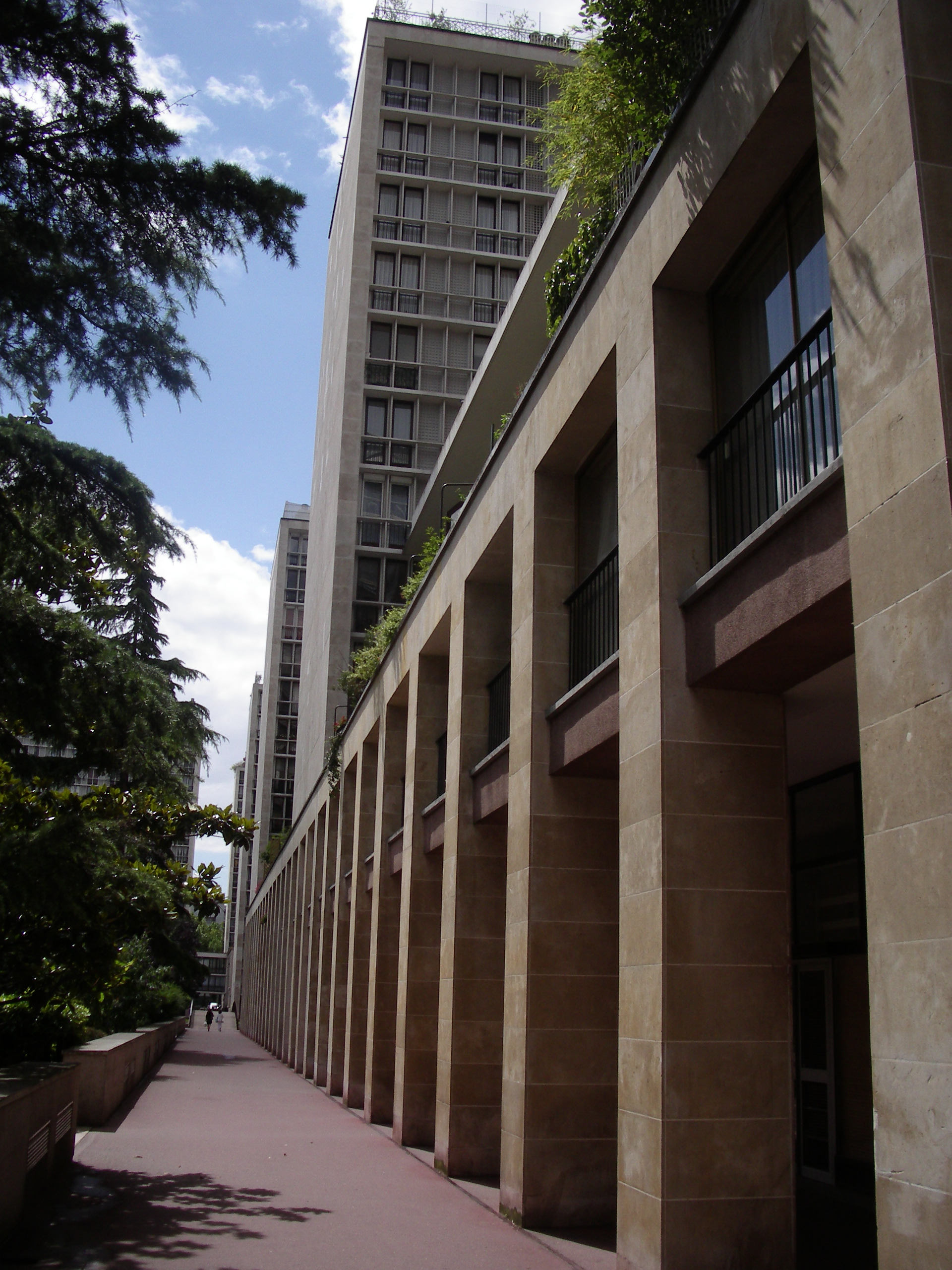
Residence Salmson, Le Point du Jour, Boulogne Billancourt, France

On 5 March 1961, Pouillon was arrested and imprisoned (awaiting trial) for his roles in the bankruptcy of a company he helped to create (le Comptoir National du Logement, the CNL) and in developing the Point du Jour housing project in Boulogne-Billancourt, a suburb near Paris. The causes of the bankruptcy are complex and included undercapitalisation of the CNL and self-dealing by its officers. The charges included fraud and misuse of corporate assets (abus de biens sociaux). Pouillon was also accused of violating securities law in order to side step rules separating architects’ roles from project construction, finance and commercialisation - that is, he was charged with using false identities and corporate entities to participate in the development and finance of the Point du Jour project. He also appears to have allied himself, through the CNL, with unscrupulous or incompetent partners. It is not clear how much Pouillon knew about these abuses, but he seems to have had some involvement. For example, construction work on his mansion in Paris was done by the CNL.^{:23-46}

On 23 September 1961, Pouillon was ejected from the French Order of Architects for breach of professional ethics.

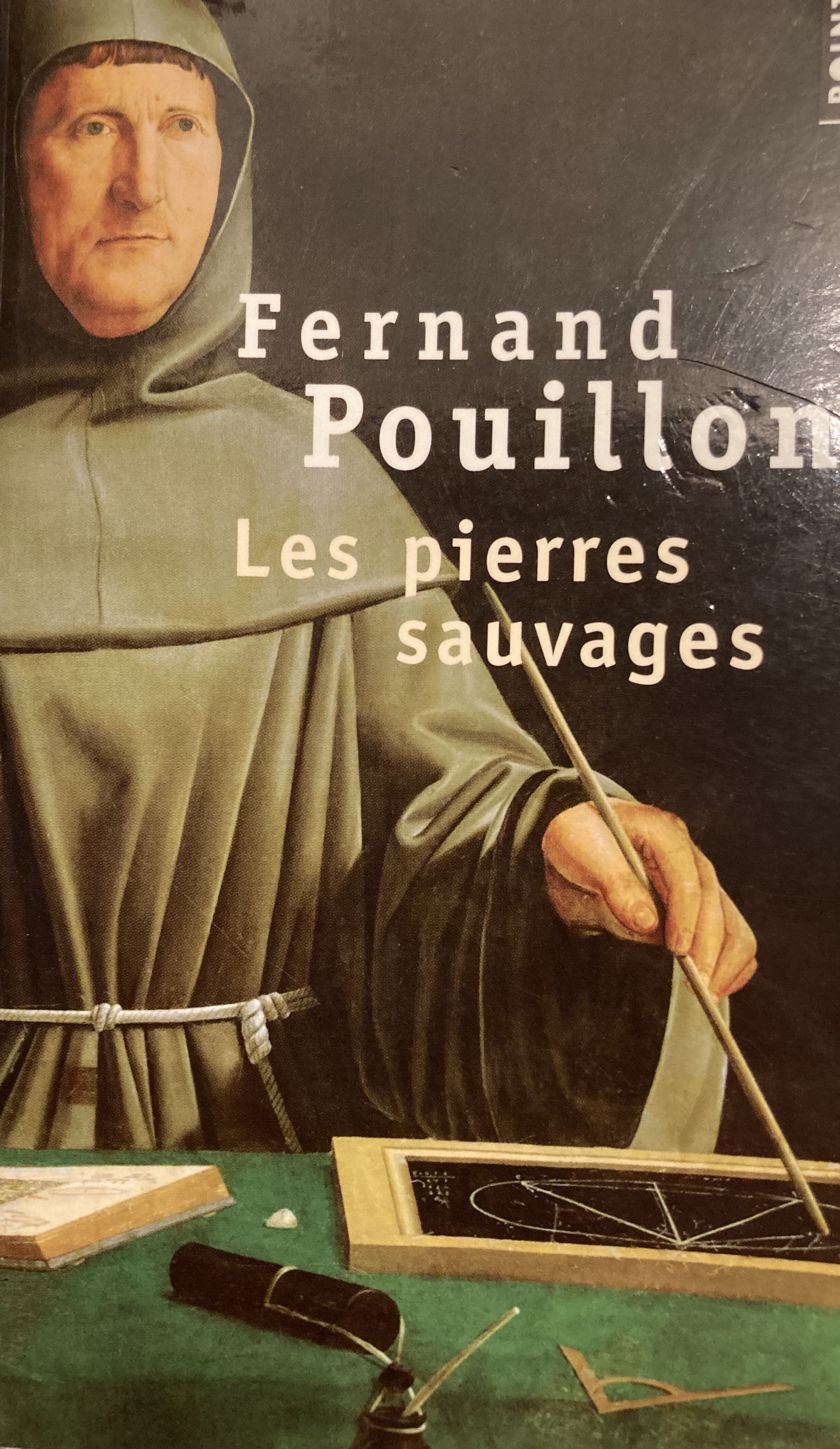
The cover of Pouillon’s award-winning novel

In September 1962, Pouillon escaped to Italy from prison (actually, from a prison health clinic). After several months, he returned voluntarily for his trial. He was found guilty, but was partially acquitted on appeal, and received a sentence that was approximately the time he had already spent in detention while awaiting trial.

While in prison he wrote Les Pierres Sauvages (The Stones of the Abbey), a book in which he imagines the medieval construction of Le Thoronet Abbey. The novel won a prestigious literary award (Les Deux Magots). He also wrote his memoirs, which were subsequently published.

Pouillon was released from prison on 24 September 1964 (some sources^{:23-46} contend that his release was also due to poor health). Thus, he spent a total of about three years in prison. After his release, his finances and his health were ruined and his already precarious marriage was over (his wife had tried to commit suicide twice during the trial and was briefly imprisoned because she was suspected of having helped Pouillon to escape).^{:74}

Because he had also been thrown out of the French Order of Architects, he could no longer practice architecture in France. In order to continue working, he moved to Algeria, where he had a successful practice with a focus on tourism and housing. He lived in Algeria from 1966 to 1984.

== Rehabilitation in France and death ==
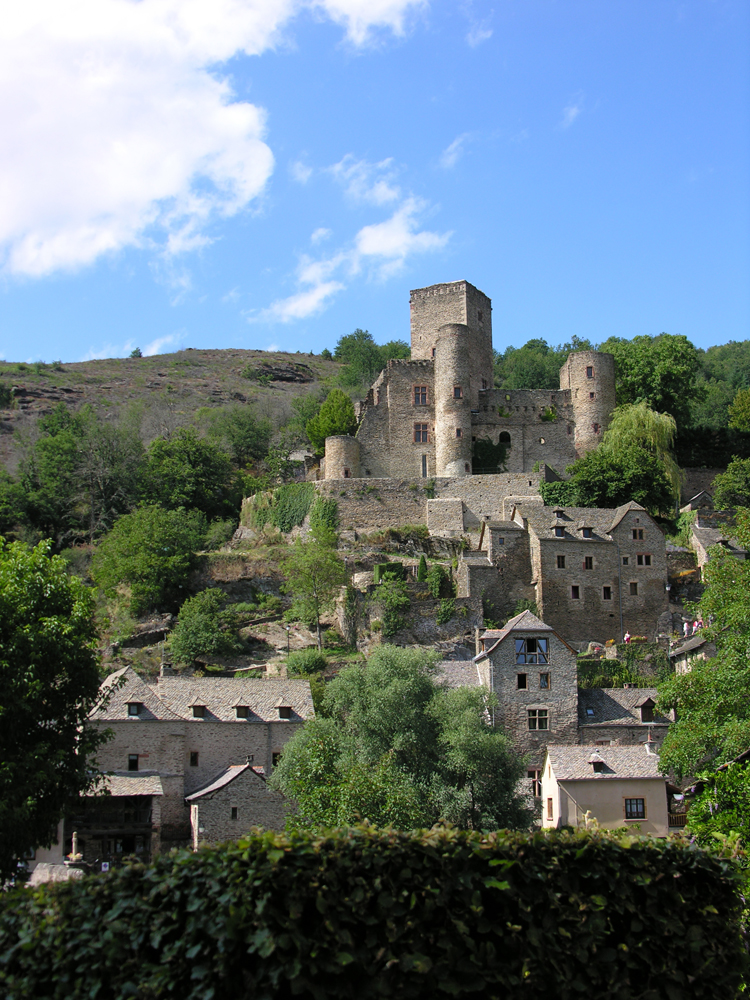
Château de Belcastel (restored by Pouillon over the 1975-1982 period), Aveyron, France

By the 1970s, influential people in France were having second thoughts about the treatment accorded to Pouillon.

In 1971, he was pardoned by the French President Georges Pompidou.^{:95}

In 1978, he was readmitted to the French Order of Architects.^{:5}

Pouillon returned definitively to France in 1984.^{:5}

In April 1984, he was named an Officer of the Légion d’Honneur (the French Order of Merit), an honour conferred in person by the French President François Mitterrand.^{:101}

He spent the last years of his life at Château de Belcastel, a medieval castle in the Aveyron department, which he had restored together with Algerian craftsmen.

He died in the Château de Belcastel on 24 July 1986. It is said that he had requested that his final resting place not show his name.

== Gallery ==
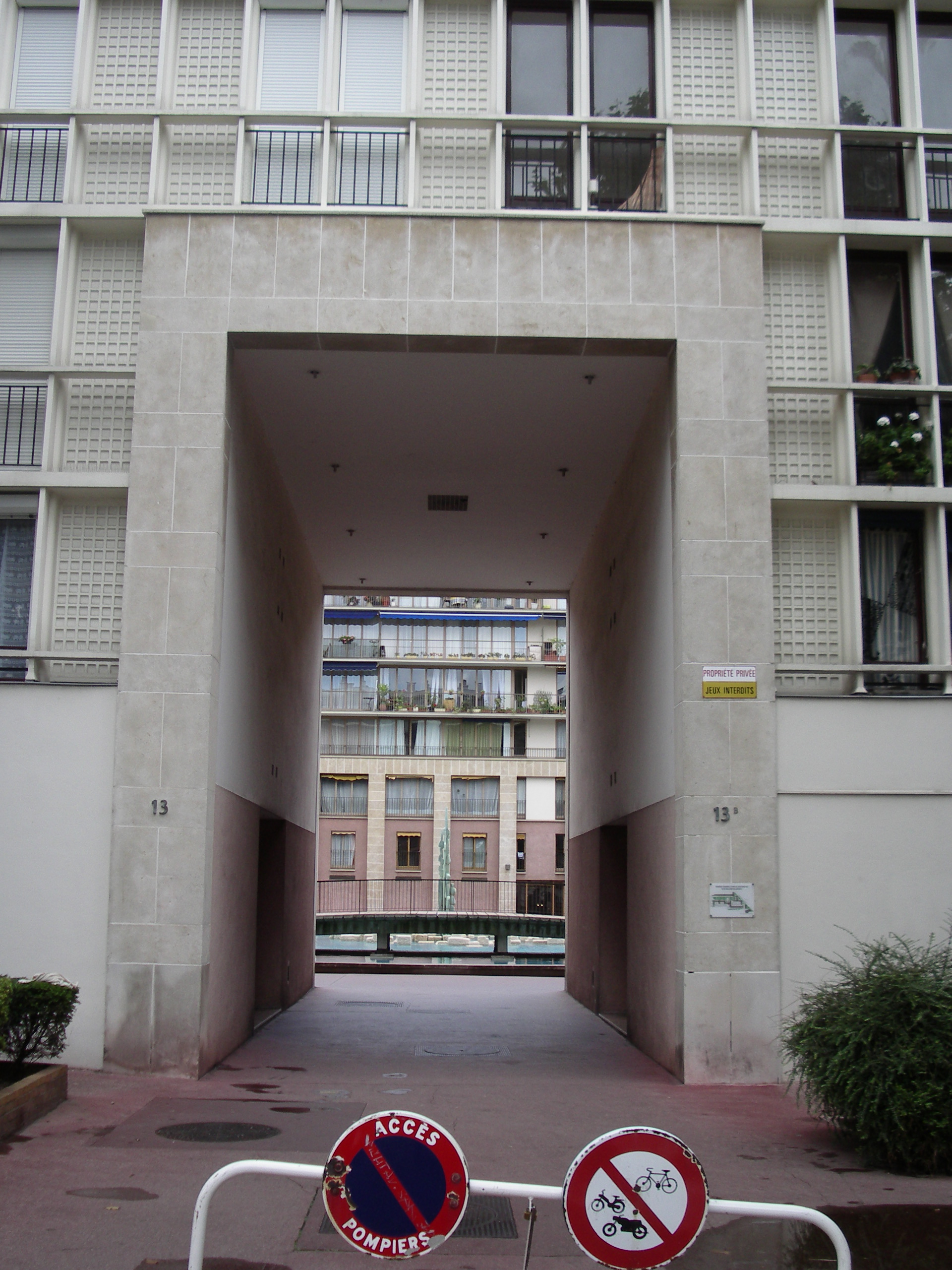
Residence Salmson, Point du Jour, Boulogne Billancourt, France. 1959-1963

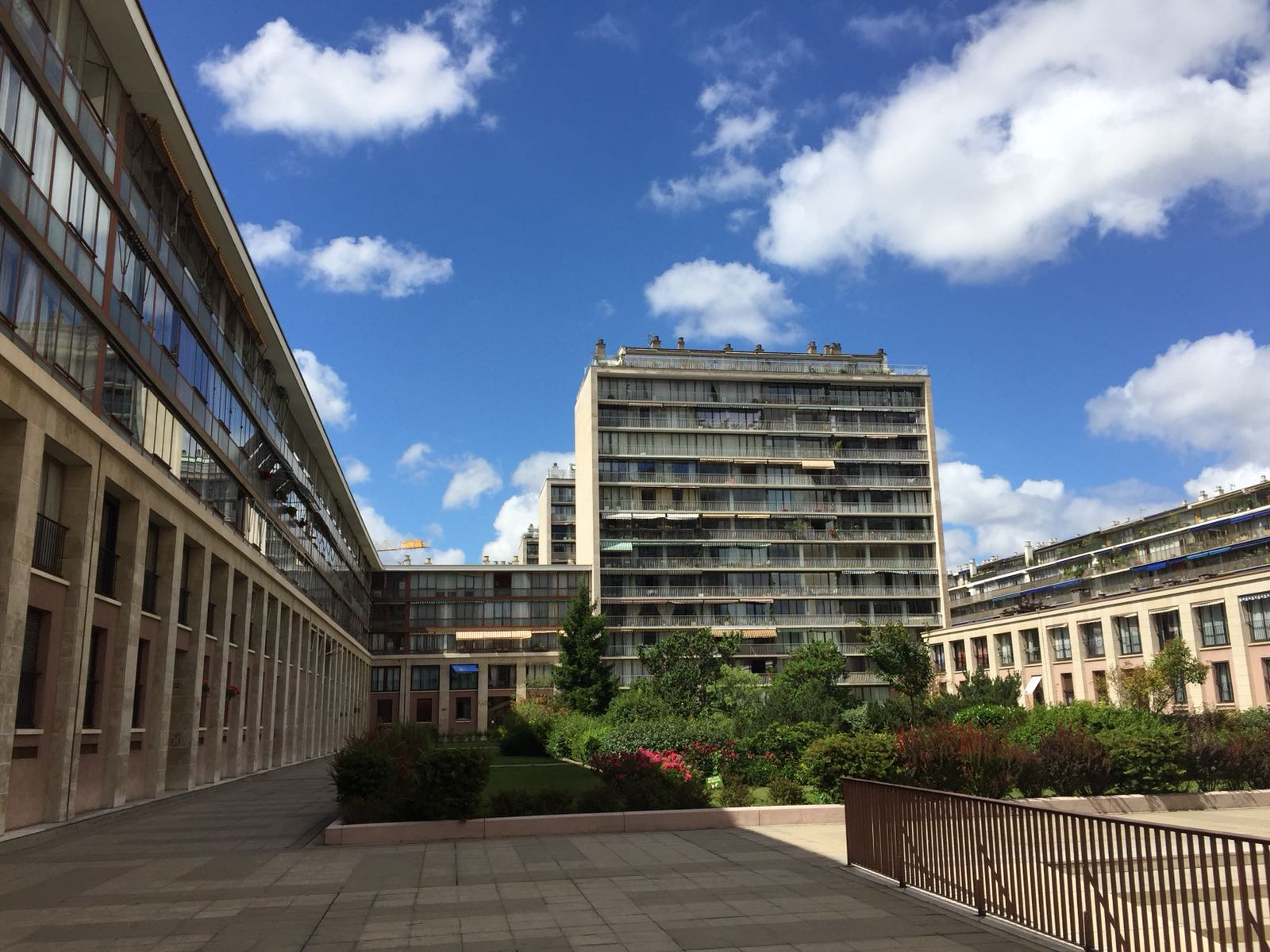
Courtyard in Point du Jour project, Boulogne Billancourt, France. 1959-1963.

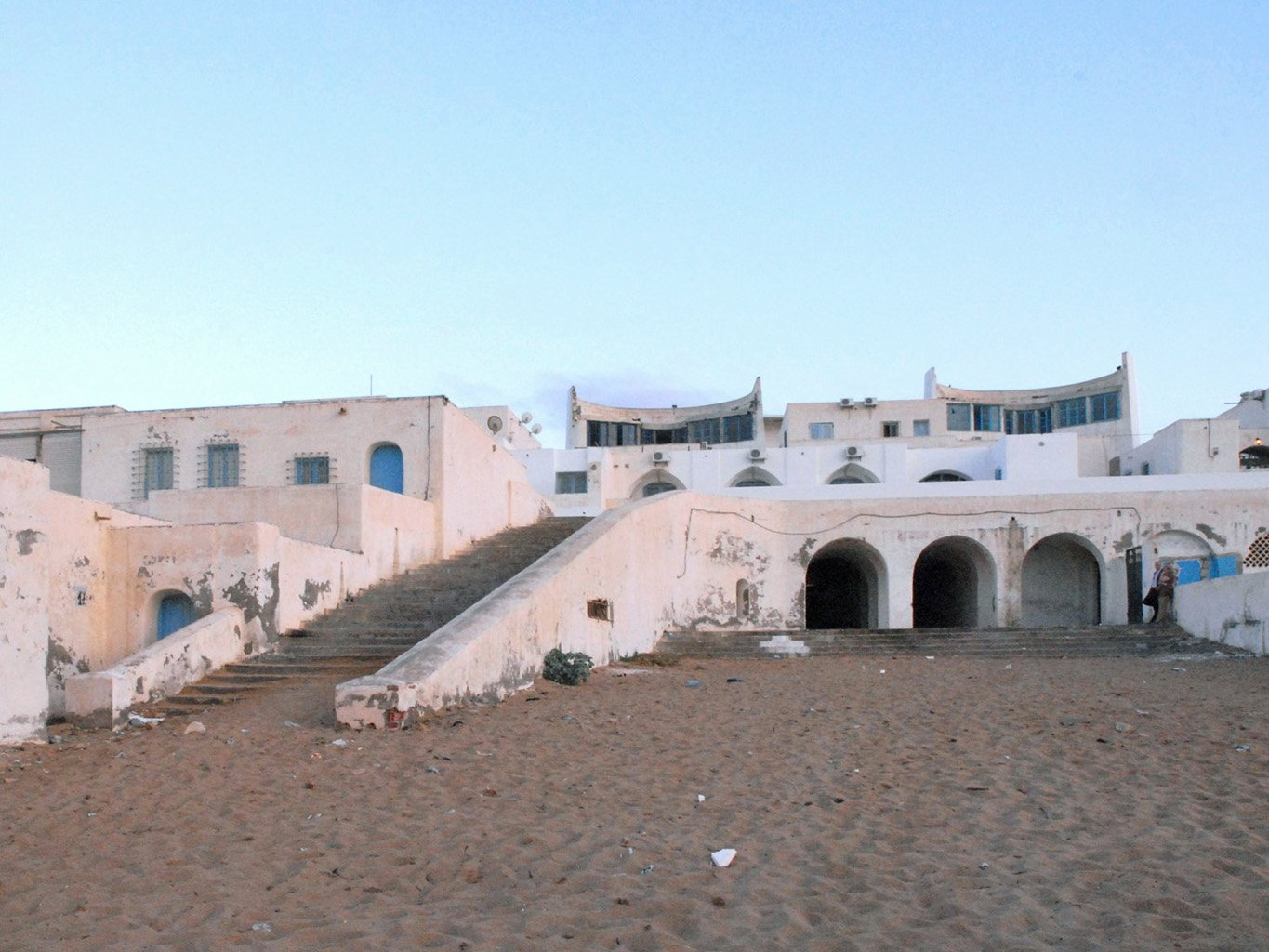
Tipaza tourism complex, Matarès. Algeria. 1968.

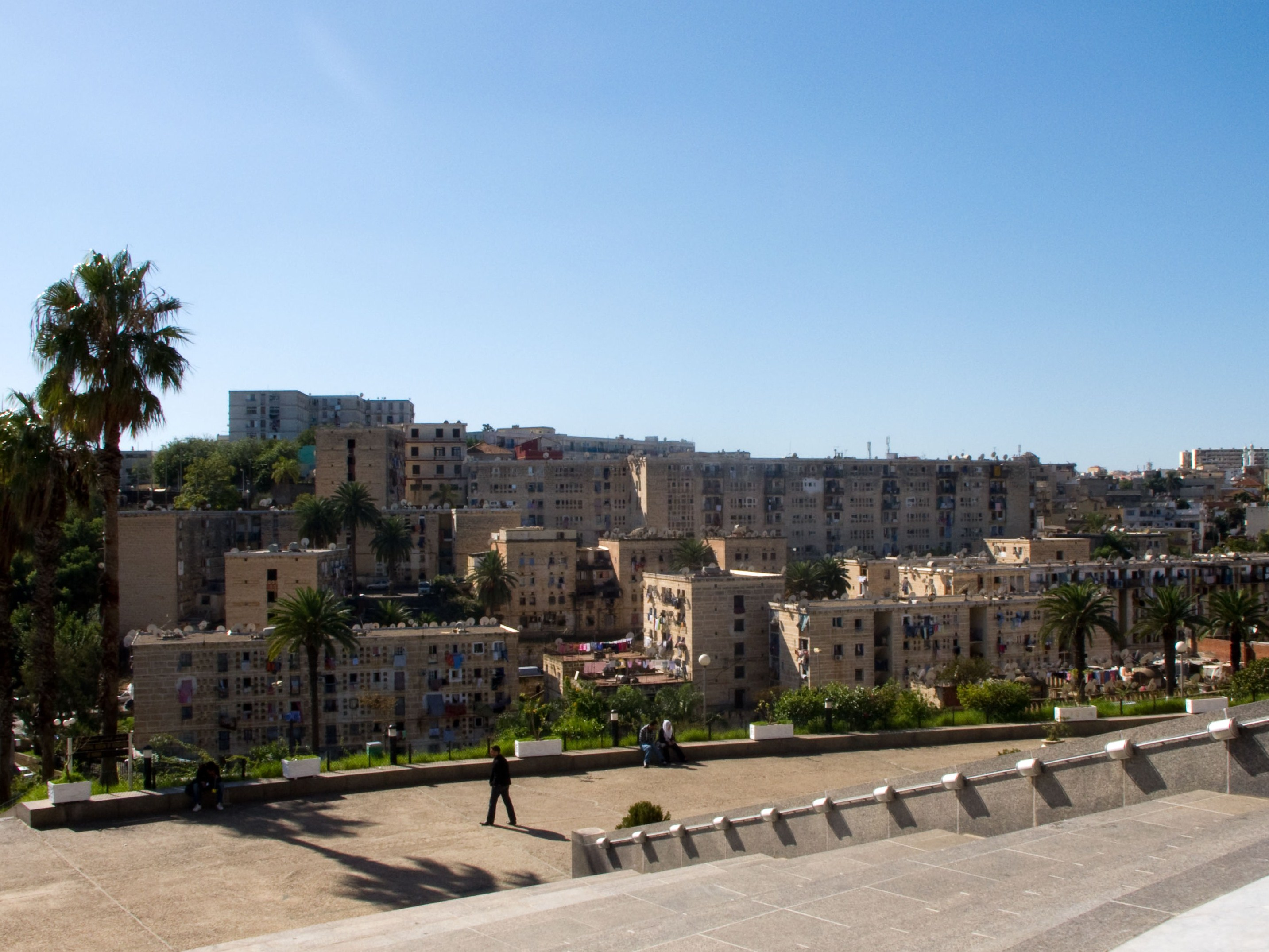
New town, Diar-El-Mahfouz, Alger, Algeria. Built 1953-1954.

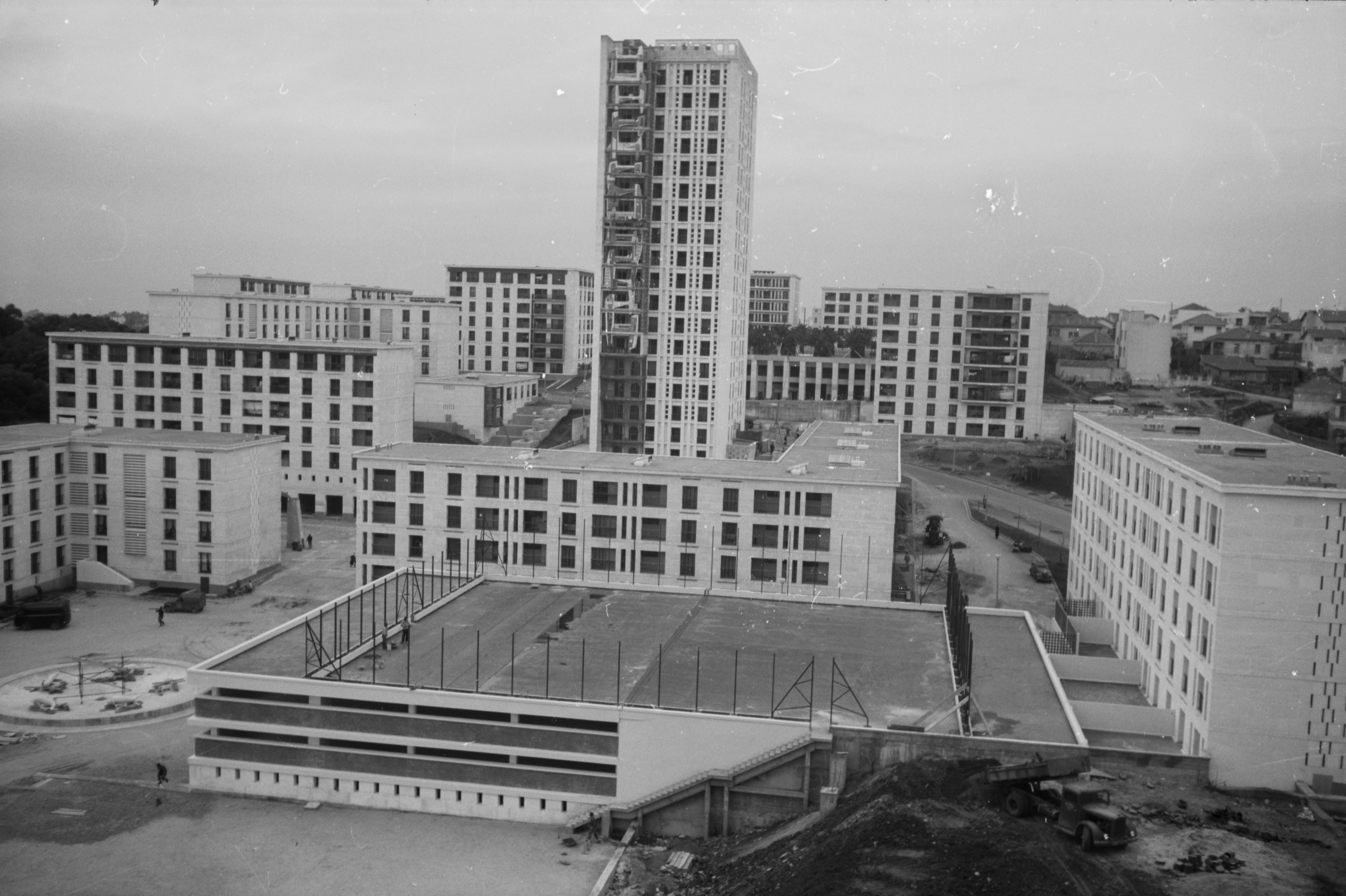
Diar es Saâda, including the tower

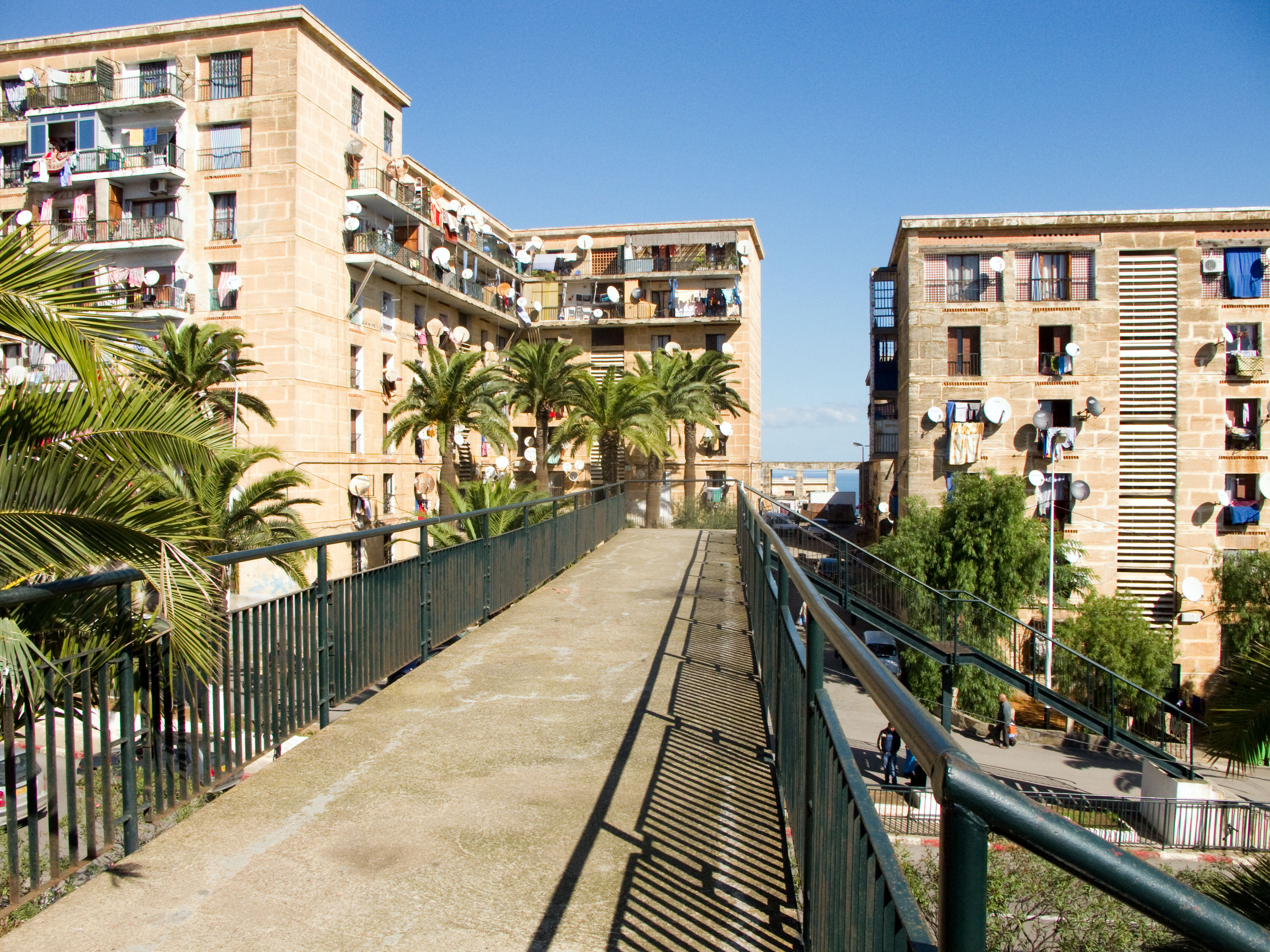
Housing complex "Confort normal" Diar-El-Mahcoul built in 18 months. 1953-55.

== Other sources ==
- Adam Caruso and Helen Thomas (Ed.): The Stones of Fernand Pouillon – An Alternative Modernism in French Architecture. gta Verlag, Zürich 2013, ISBN 978-3-85676-324-4.
- Stéphane Gruet, Pouillon, une architecture durable et autres brefs essais, éd. Transversales, Saint-Cloud, 2018
