= Can-con =

Can-Con may refer to:

- Can Con, Short for "Canadian Content", a Canadian policy requiring a set percentage of Canadian works on the Canadian Airwaves
- CAN-CON (convention), Ottawa Literary science fiction convention
- Cancon, a commune in Nouvelle-Aquitaine, France
