= Château de Belcastel =

Medieval castle in Aveyron, France

Coordinates: 44°23′20″N 2°20′10″E

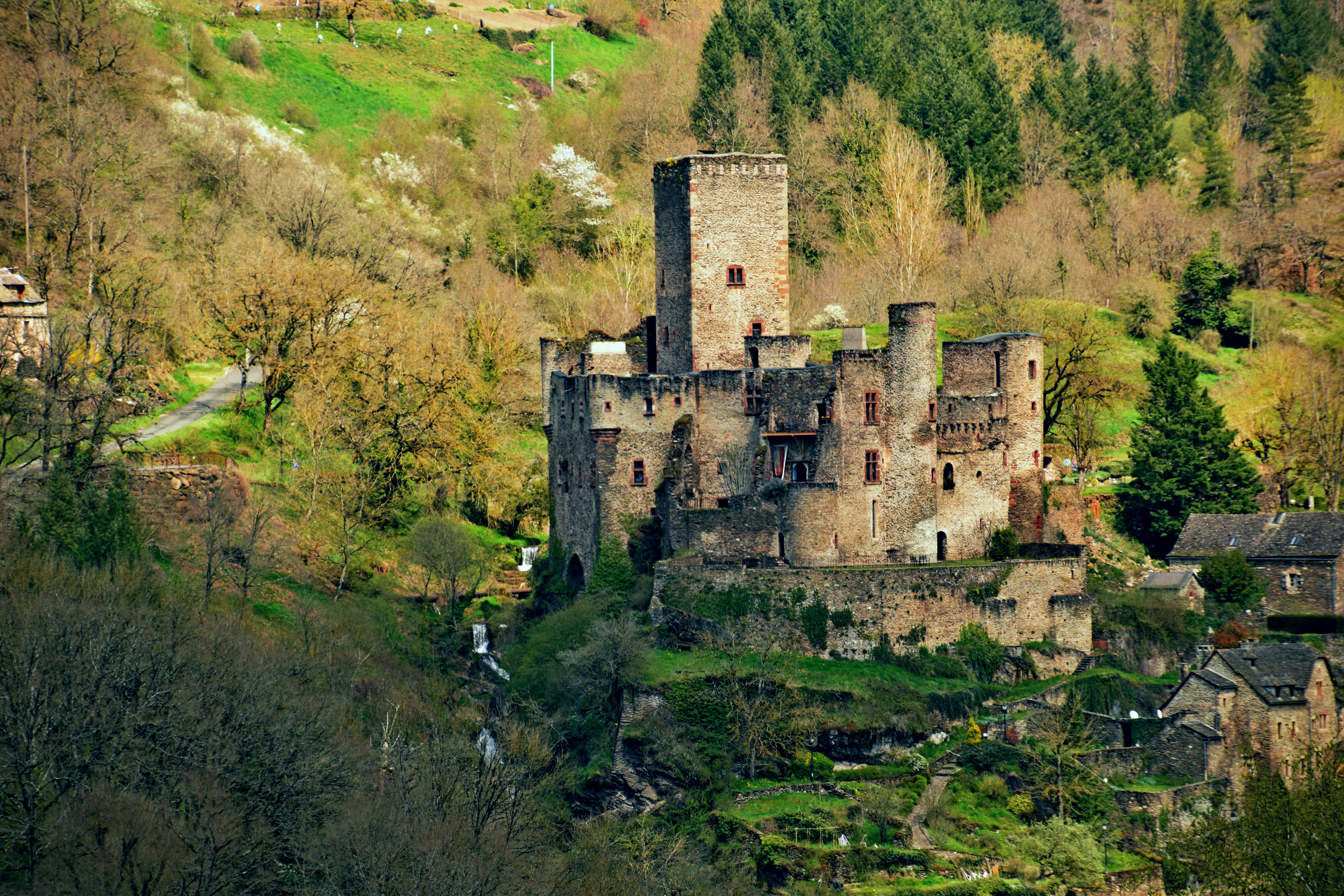
Château de Belcastel

The Château de Belcastel is a medieval castle in the village and commune of Belcastel, in the Aveyron département of France. It is situated above the north bank of the river Aveyron, downstream from Rodez. The oldest part of the castle was constructed in the 9th century, and it grew in the hands of the Belcastel family. Later, for many decades, it was the seat of the famed Saunhac family.

The Château de Belcastel was officially declared a historic monument by the French Ministry of Culture in 1928. The famous French architect Fernand Pouillon (1912-1986) discovered the castle in ruins in 1974. Pouillon decided to reconstruct the fortress, which had been abandoned since at least the 17th century. Pouillon himself undertook the restoration by hand, along with the help of a dozen Algerian stonemasons, and 10 stained-glass experts. The work was accomplished in eight years, and it called for great courage from Pouillon and his colleagues, due to the size of the undertaking, the castle's dangerous location, and the fact that no machines were used in the reconstruction.

Pouillon also undertook the restoration of the village, which is now recognised with the award of the title of one of Les Plus Beaux Villages de France ("The most beautiful villages in France").

The Château de Belcastel remained the private residence of Pouillon until he died in Belcastel on 24 July 1986. In 2005, the two owners of the AFA Gallery in New York purchased the château and opened it to the public as both a gallery and a historical monument. They have embellished the interior with medieval artifacts and created art galleries within the château, while allowing the medieval fortress and remarkable architecture to remain undisturbed. In 2017, the owner Heidi Leigh created the Heritage of Fernand Pouillon Association to make projects about art and architecture with family, friends and fans of Pouillon. In the same year, the French Ministry of Culture honoured her with a medal, and the title Chevalier des Arts et des Lettres, for her efforts in bringing art, music and masterclasses to France through AFA Gallery to the Chateau de Belcastel.

The Château de Belcastel is one of a group of 23 castles in Aveyron which have joined to provide a tourist itinerary as La Route des Seigneurs du Rouergue.

== Gallery ==
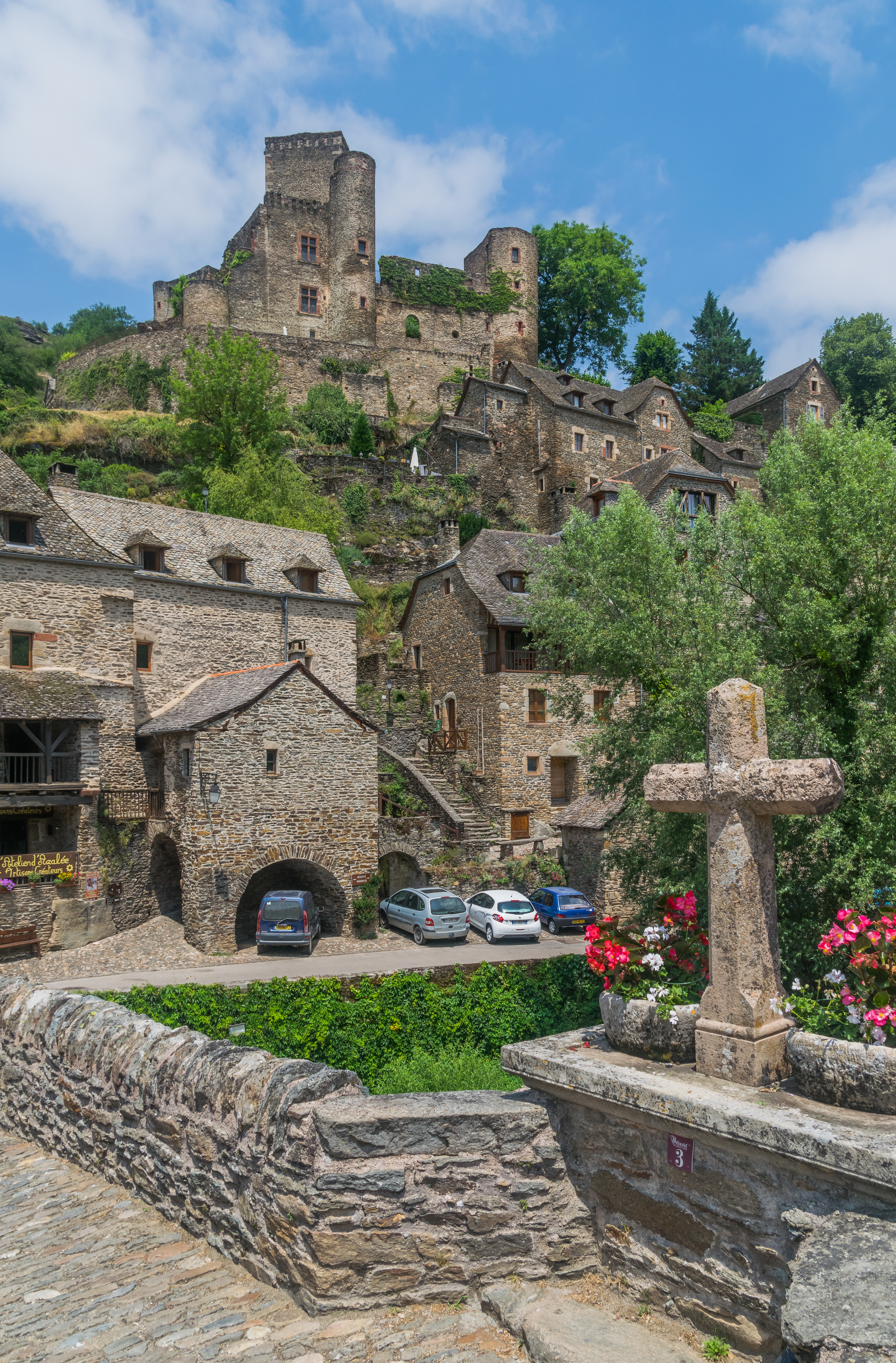
The village with the castle

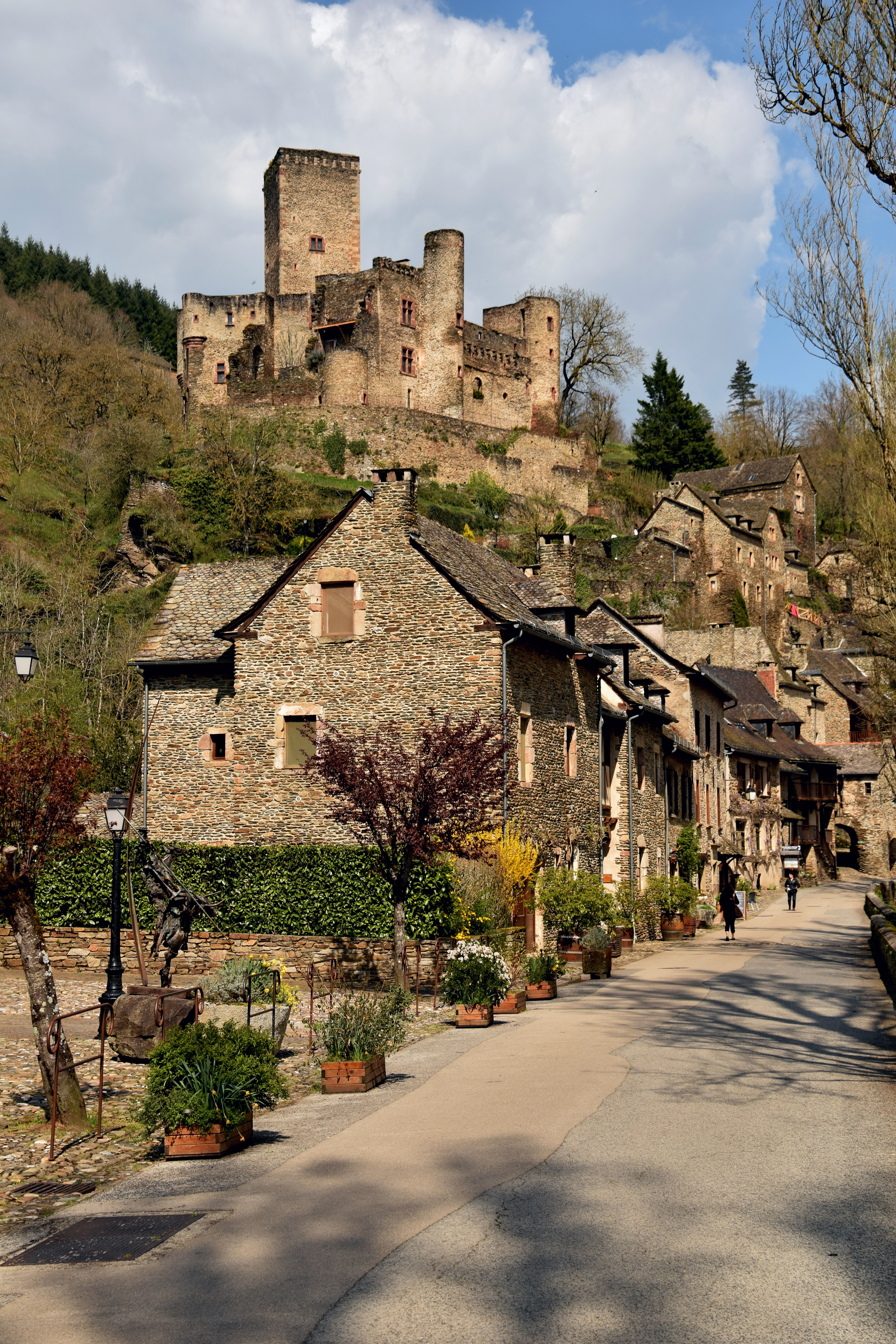
Another view of the village

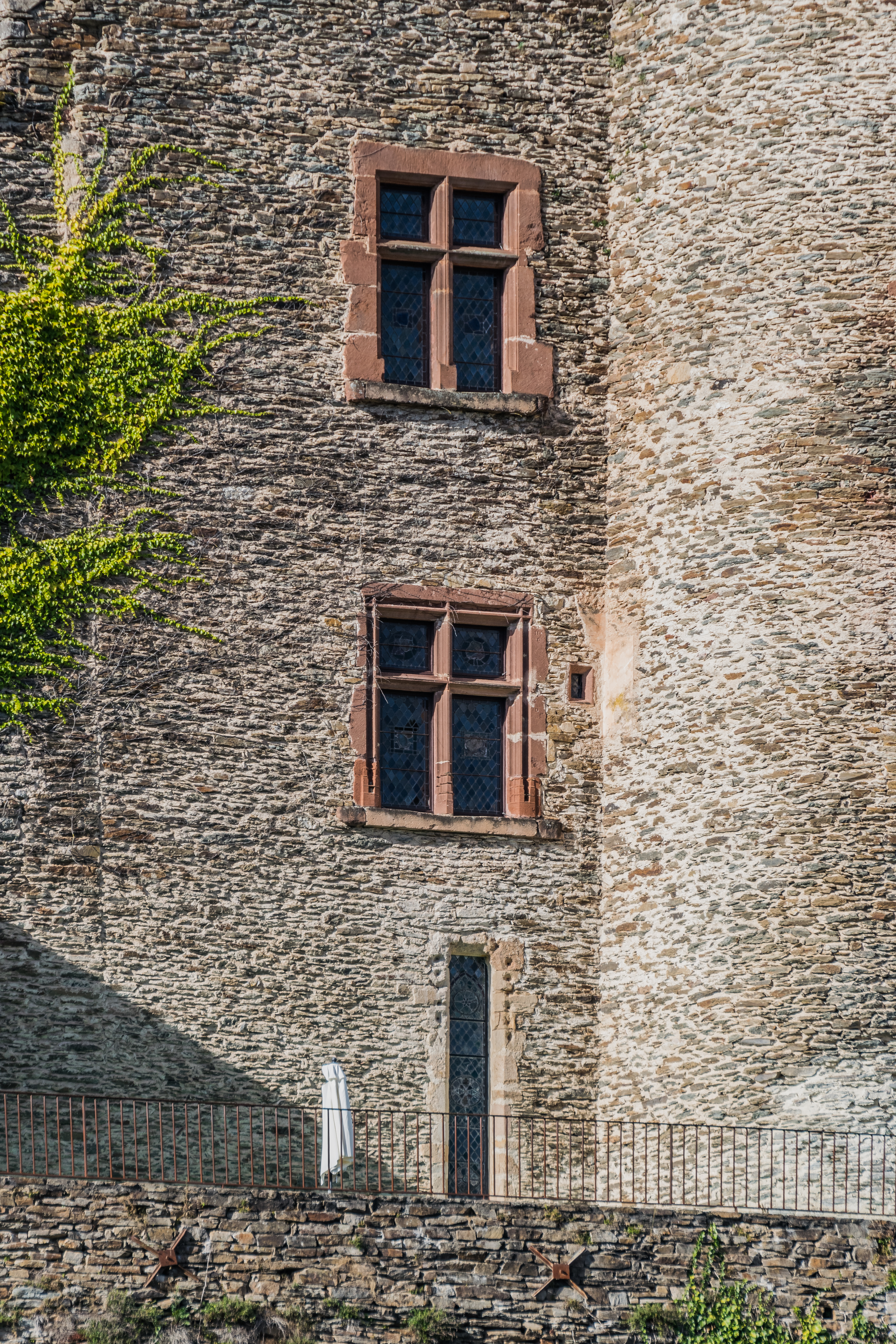
Detail of the façade

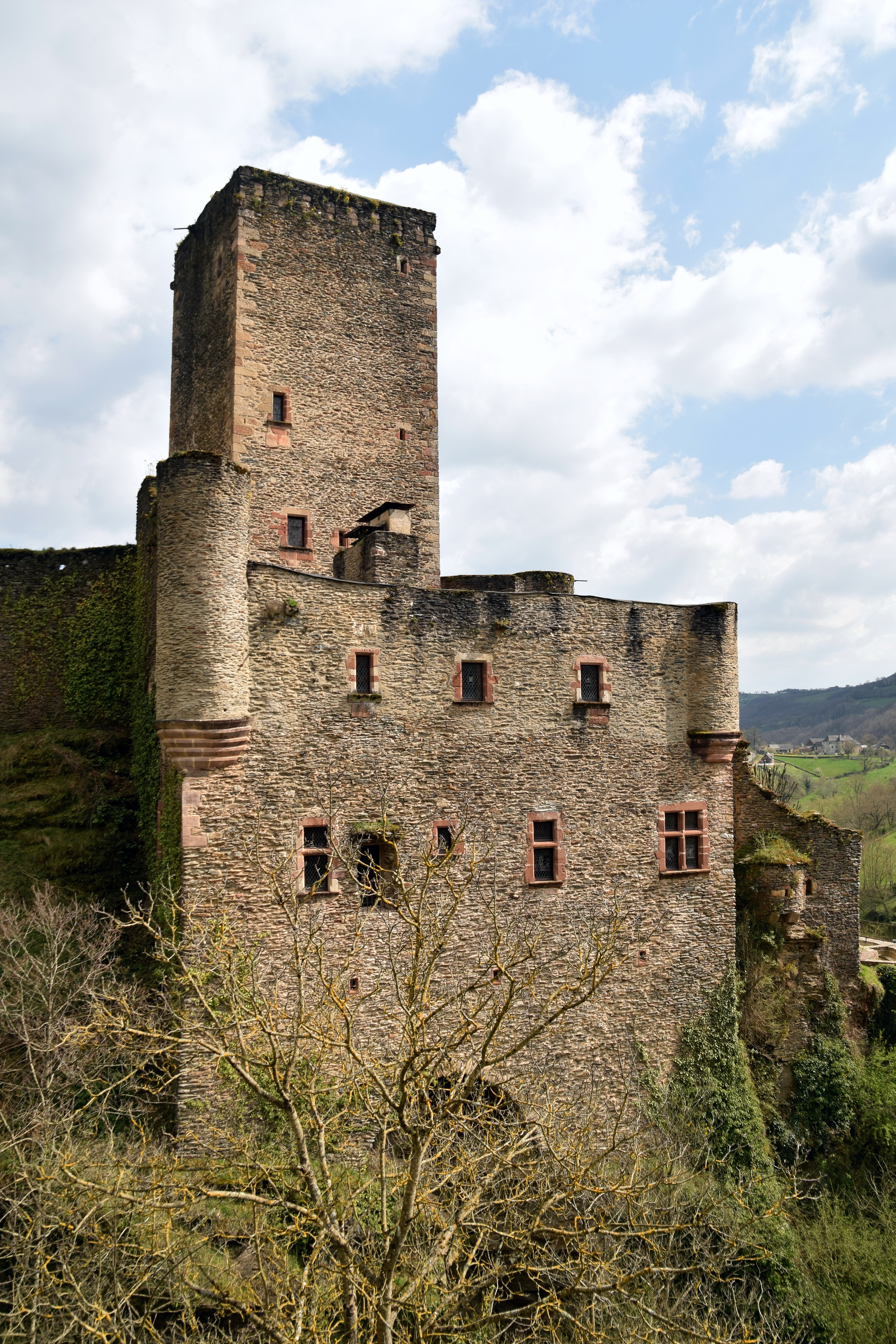
Walls plus dungeon

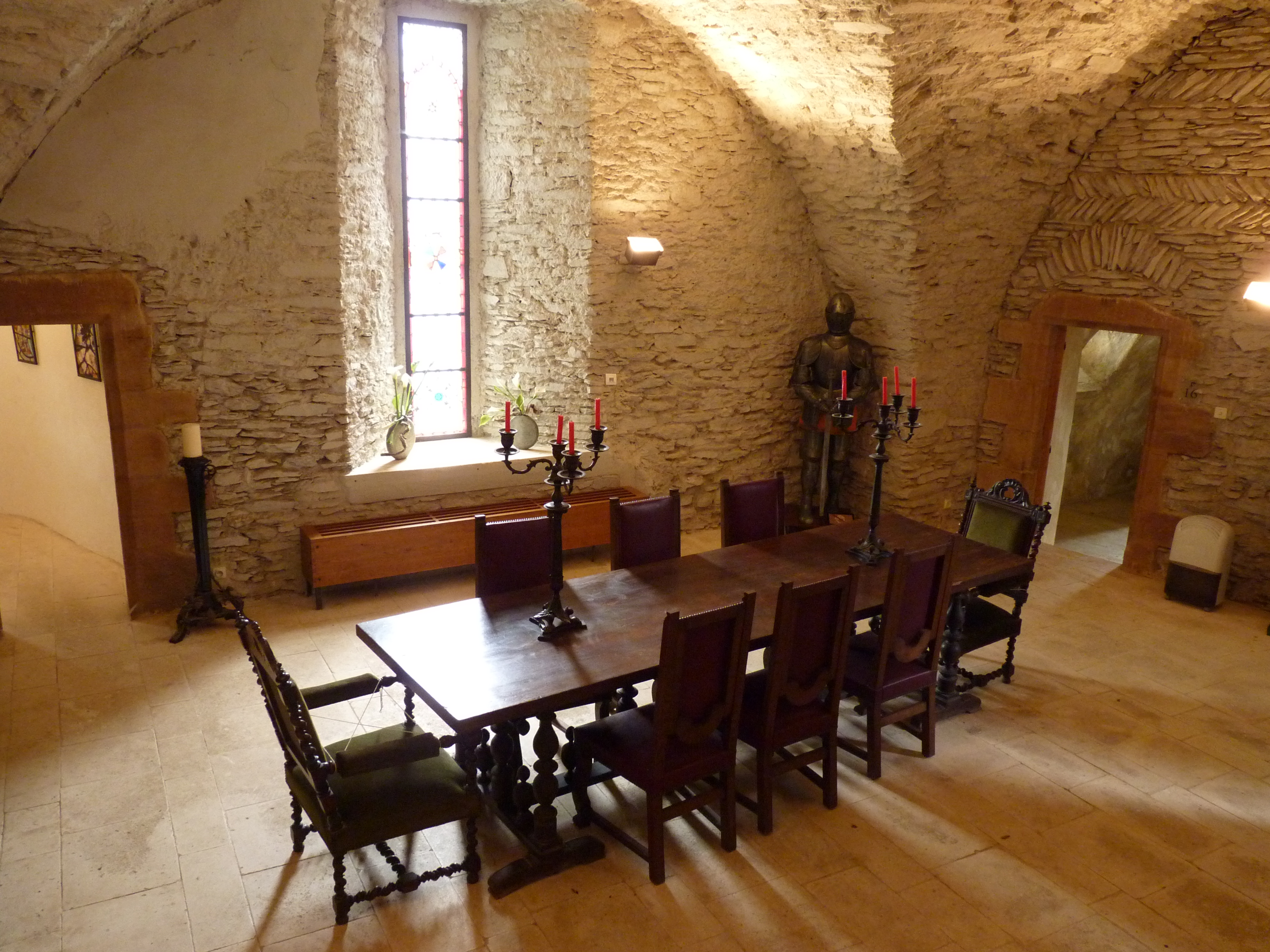
View of interior

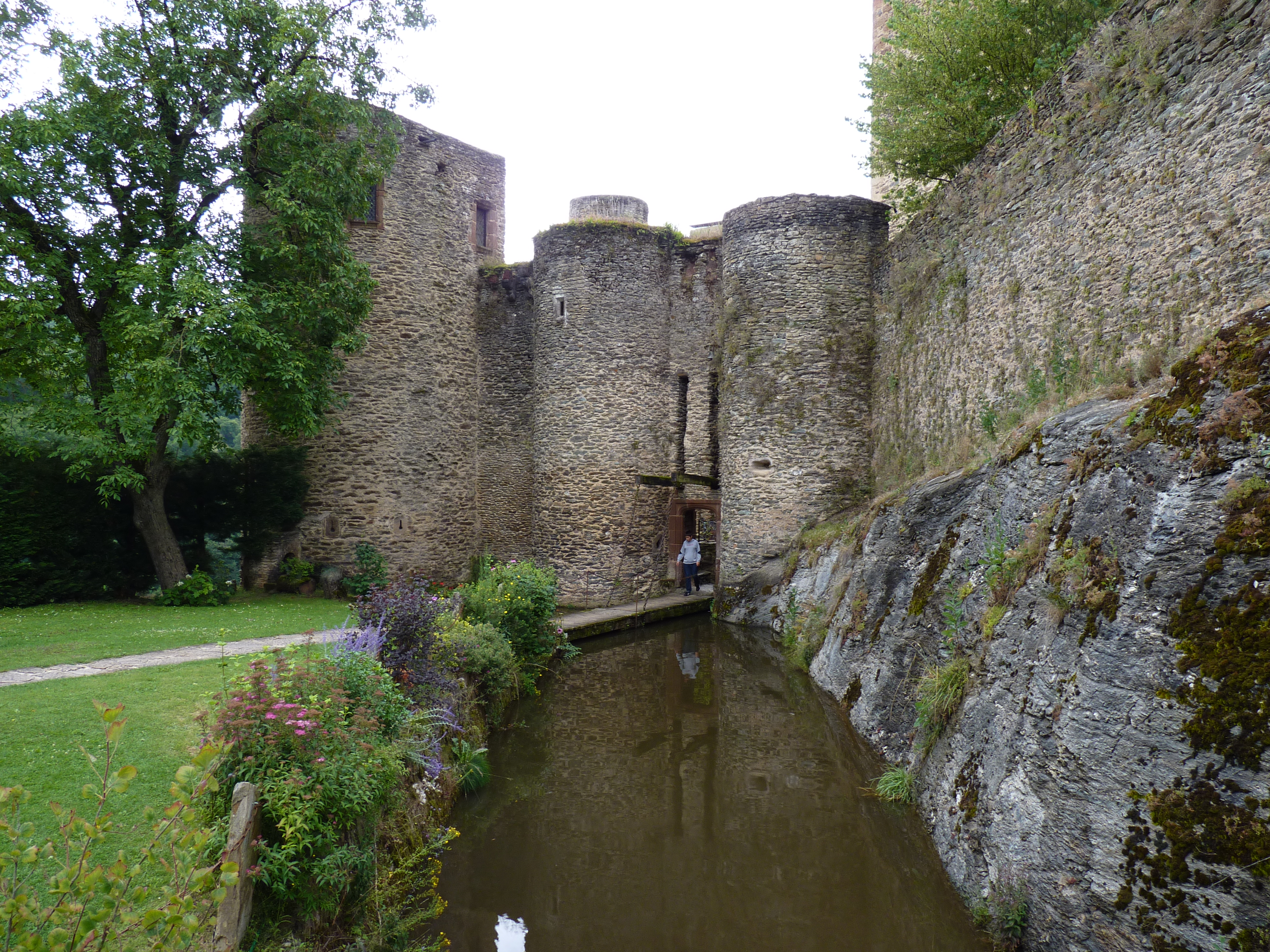
Castle walls plus moat

== See also ==
- List of castles in France
- Route des Seigneurs du Rouergue
