= Diar el Mahçoul =

Diar El Mahçoul ديار المحصول
- Housing complex and district
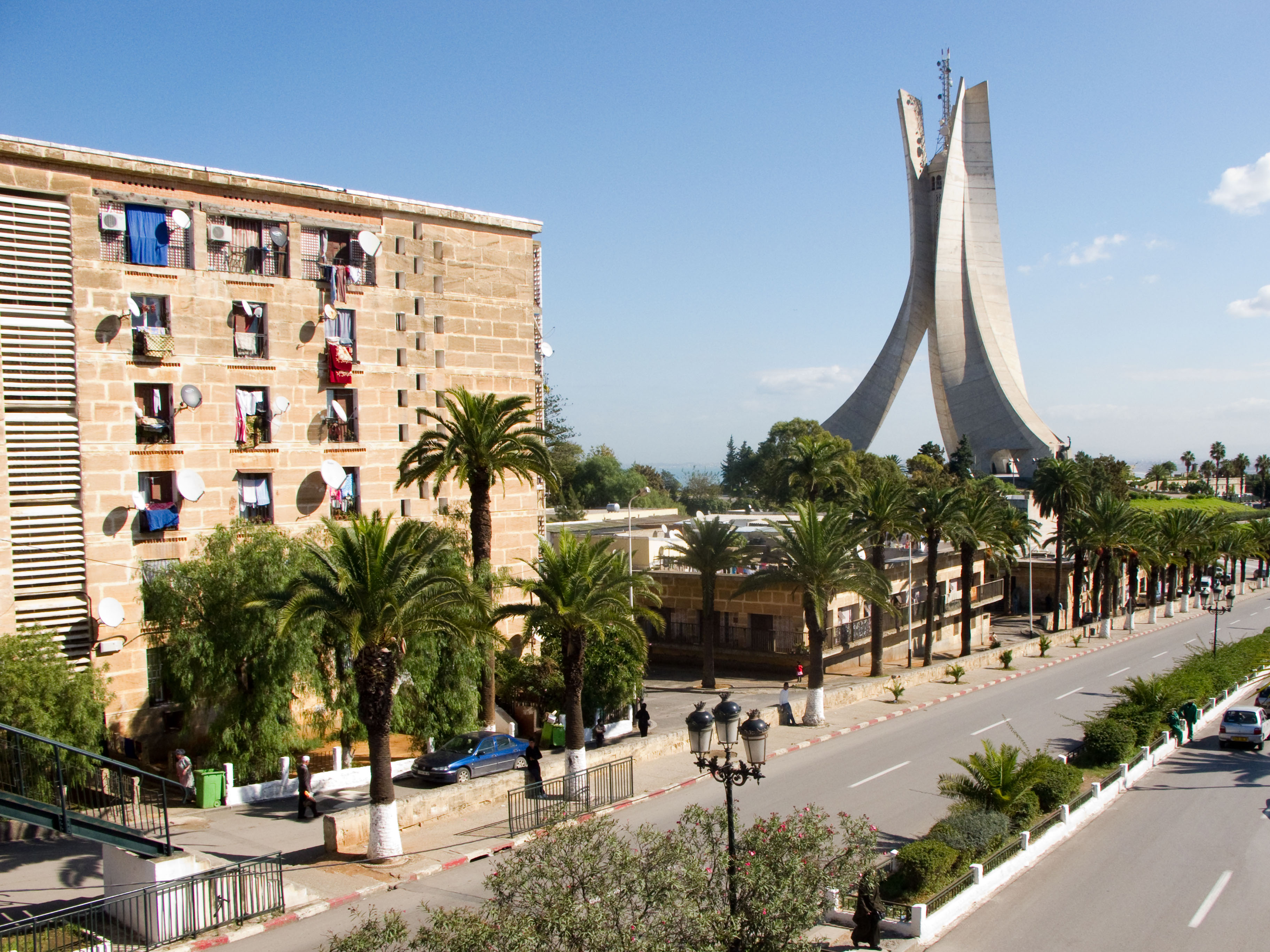
- Interactive map of Diar El Mahçoul
- Coordinates: 36.7465°N 3.0671°E
- Country: Algeria
- Province: Algiers Province
- District: Sidi M'Hamed District
- City: Algiers
- Quarters: Belouizdad, Algiers; El Madania
- Developed: 1953-1955

Diar el Mahçoul (Arabic: ديار المحصول, lit. 'land of plenty') is a residential complex and district of Algiers, Algeria, split between the quarters of Belouizdad and El Madania. Diar el Mahçoul was developed by the French modernist architect and urban planner Fernand Pouillon between 1953 and 1955.

The Martyrs' Memorial (Arabic: مقام الشهيد,), which houses the National Museum of El Mujahid, stands at the edge of the development. The structure, constructed in 1982, is one of the city's most recognizable buildings.

== History ==
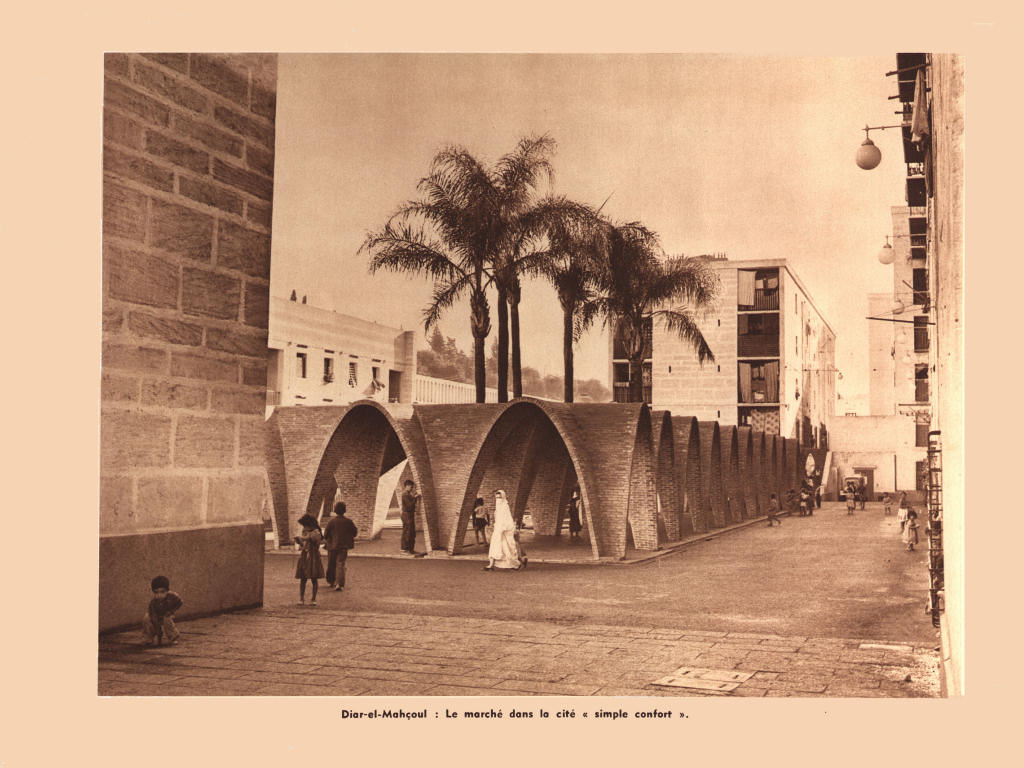
Covered market

=== Construction ===
When Jacques Chevallier became the mayor of Algiers in 1953, he appointed Fernand Pouillon as chief architect of the city and commissioned him to develop three residential complexes: Diar el Mahçoul, Diar es-Saada, and Climat de France; Diar el Mahçoul, Diar es-Saada were to occupy the hills overlooking the Bay of Algiers and Botanical Garden Hamma while Climat de France lied further north. All three developments were built atop land previously occupied by bidonvilles, an action allegedly motivated by a French desire to make the casbah more easily policeable.

Diar el Mahçoul was divided into two quarters by Oulmane Khelifa boulevard: cité confort normal and cité simple confort; the two quarters together totaling 1,454 units. The cité confort normal, originally reserved for Europeans, sits on the north side of Oulmane Khelifa boulevard, overlooking the bay of Algiers. The cité simple confort, originally designated for Muslim-Algerian residents, lies on the opposite side if the road. While the development's living quarters were racially segregated, Diar el Mahçoul afforded a number of integrated facilities, making it the only development in Algiers to do so. This racial cohabitation was intended to work as a vehicle for social reform; in constructing an semi-integrated development, Chevallier hoped reinforce a sentiment of French-Algerian cooperation and gain loyalty from his colonial subjects.

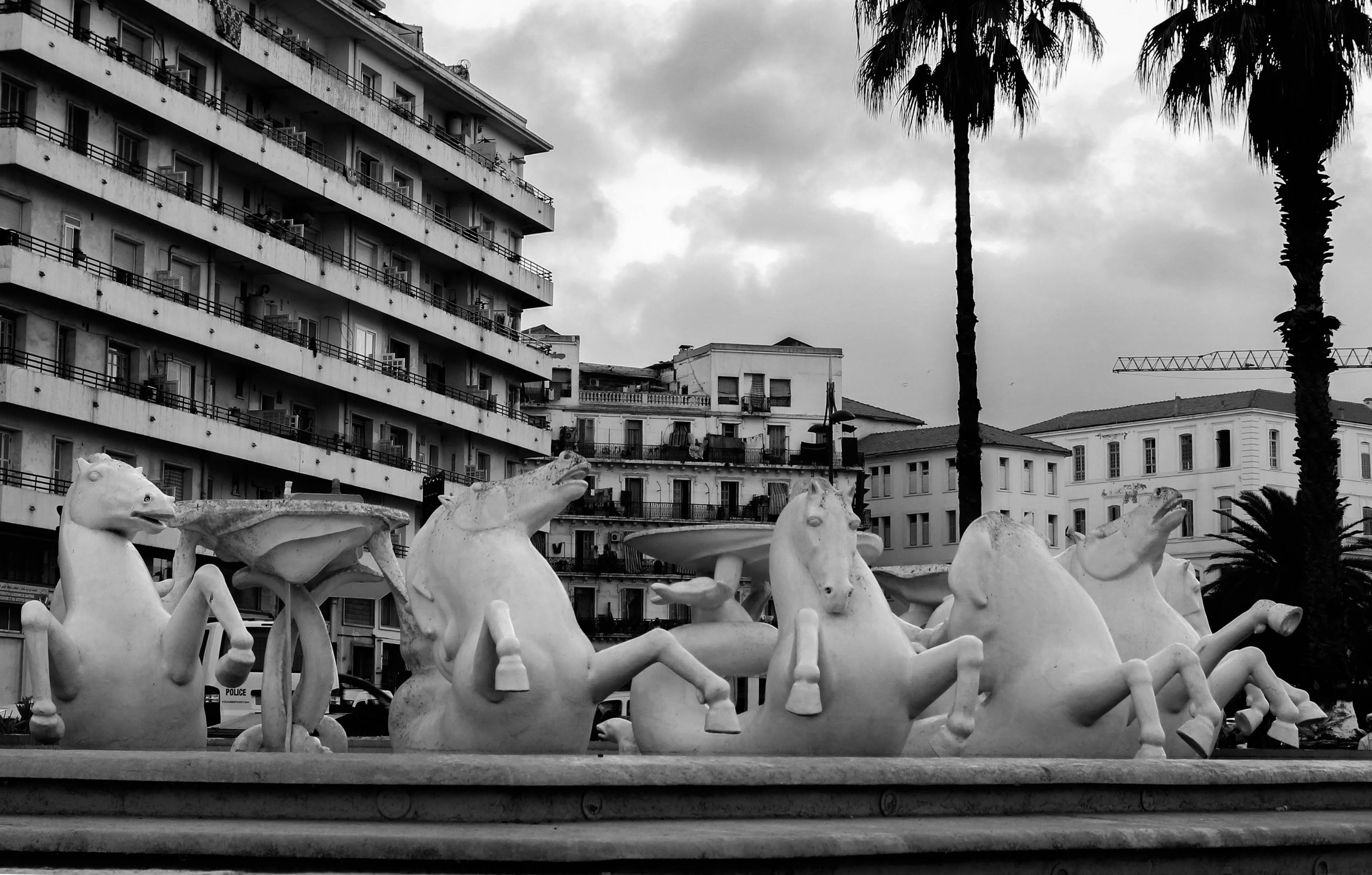
"Fontaine aux Chevaux" fountain originally in the cité confort normal, relocated to Bab El Oued in the 1970

=== Algerian War ===
In the late 1950s the site became characterized by division and increasing tension between its Algerian residents and the nation's French authority. Such tensions were exacerbated by communal political affiliation brought about by Diar el Mahçoul's high density and ethnic segregation. In 1957, Algerian residents interrupted a visit to the neighborhood by Mayor Chevallier, shouting "Algeria is ours" and throwing stones. Tensions reached a climax on December 11, 1960, when the Algerian residents of the district marched to join independence demonstrations at the rue de Lyon, Belcourt. In response to pro-independence demonstrations, French residents of the European quarter responded with their own protests; nicknamed "concerts de casseroles," these demonstrations were characterized with the banging of pots and pans accompanied by calls for "French Algeria!" During the Algerian War a large number of French residents of Diar el Mahçoul and the greater El Madania fled; many of their abandoned apartments were reclaimed by Algerians.

=== Post-Independence ===
Following Algerian independence, St. Jean Baptiste Church, built behind the historical Villa des Arcades as part of the French quarter, was converted into a mosque via the 1966 addition of a minaret. The original plans made no provisions for the construction of a mosque on the site.

The Martyrs' Memorial was opened along the southwestern edge of the cité confort normal in 1982 to commemorate the Algerian War of Independence. Standing at 92 metres (302 ft) tall, the building is one of the city's most recognizable tourist destinations.
