= Belcastel, Aveyron =

Commune in Occitanie, France

Belcastel Bèlcastèl (Occitan)
- Commune
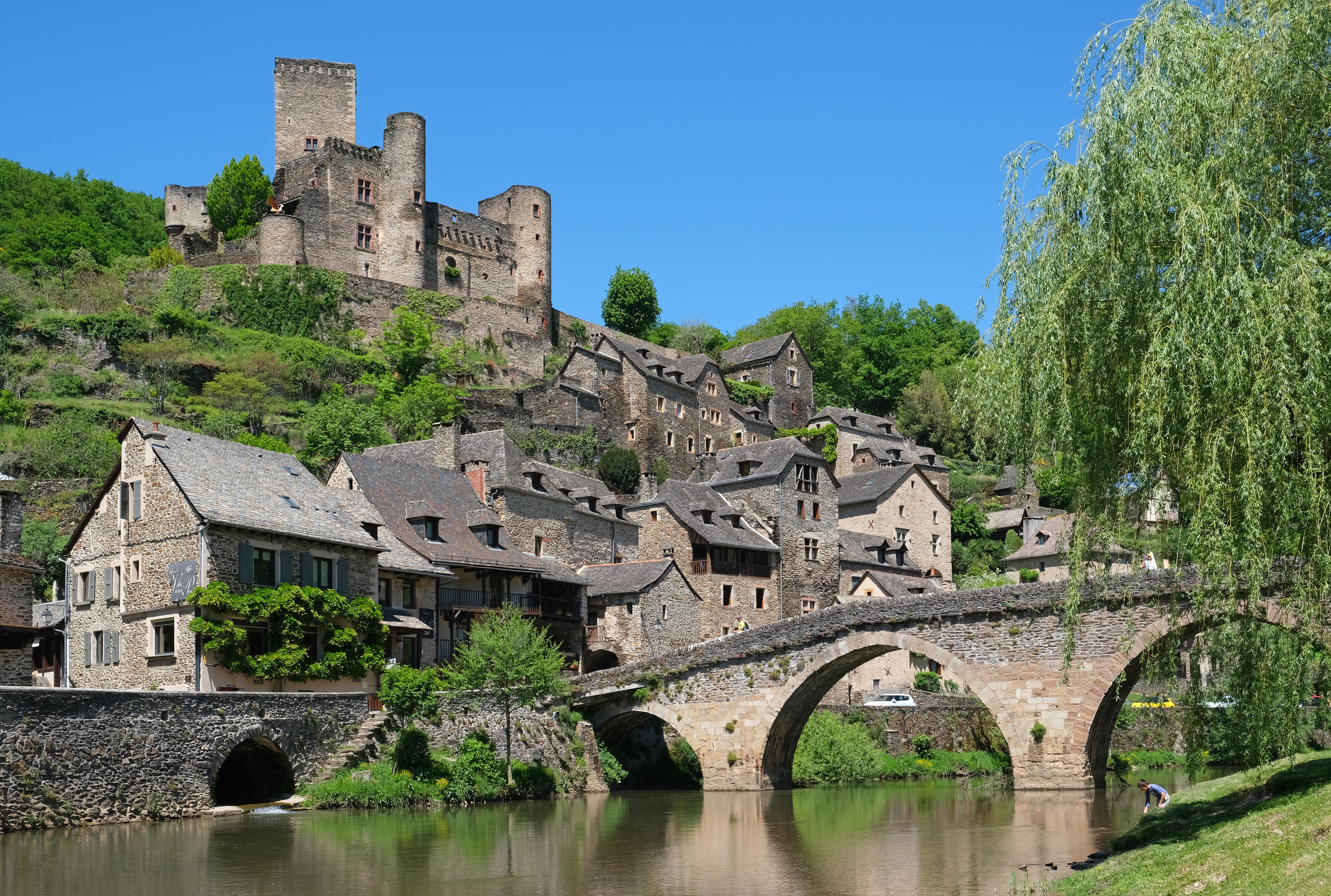
- A view of Belcastel

- Coat of arms
- Location of Belcastel
- Location within France Location within Occitanie
- Coordinates: 44°23′22″N 2°20′16″E
- Country: France
- Region: Occitania
- Department: Aveyron
- Arrondissement: Villefranche-de-Rouergue
- Canton: Enne et Alzou
- Intercommunality: Pays Rignacois

Government
  - Mayor (2020–2026): Jean-Louis Bessiere
- Area^{1}: 10.74 km^{2} (4.15 sq mi)
- Elevation: 450 m (1,480 ft)
- Highest elevation: 707 m (2,320 ft)
- Lowest elevation: 391 m (1,283 ft)
- Population (2023): 189
  - Density: 17.6/km^{2} (45.6/sq mi)
- Time zone: UTC+01:00 (CET)
  - Summer (DST): UTC+02:00 (CEST)
- INSEE/Postal code: 12024 /12390
- ^{1} French Land Register data, which excludes lakes, ponds, glaciers > 1 km^{2} (0.386 sq mi or 247 acres) and river estuaries.

Belcastel (French pronunciation: [bɛlkastɛl]; Occitan: Bèlcastèl) is a commune in the Aveyron department in the Occitania region in Southern France.

The village is medieval in character, with cobbled streets and lauze-roofed (stone tiled) houses. The bulk of the village and the castle (Château de Belcastel) are situated on the steep north bank of the river Aveyron. Several buildings including the 15th-century church are on the south side of the river, with a similarly aged bridge connecting the two.

A ruined fort, the Fort du Lourdou, can also be found about a kilometre west of the village on the south bank of the river at the Roc d'Anglars. Belcastel was nominated as one of the "most beautiful villages of France" (Les Plus Beaux Villages de France) in 1990; the local council regularly hosts watercolour competitions and art exhibitions during the summer.

== Demographics ==
Historical population
Year	Pop.	±% p.a.
1968	280	—
1975	266	−0.73%
1982	249	−0.94%
1990	245	−0.20%
1999	251	+0.27%
2007	231	−1.03%
2012	216	−1.33%
2017	191	−2.43%
2023	189	−0.18%
Source: INSEE

== Gallery ==
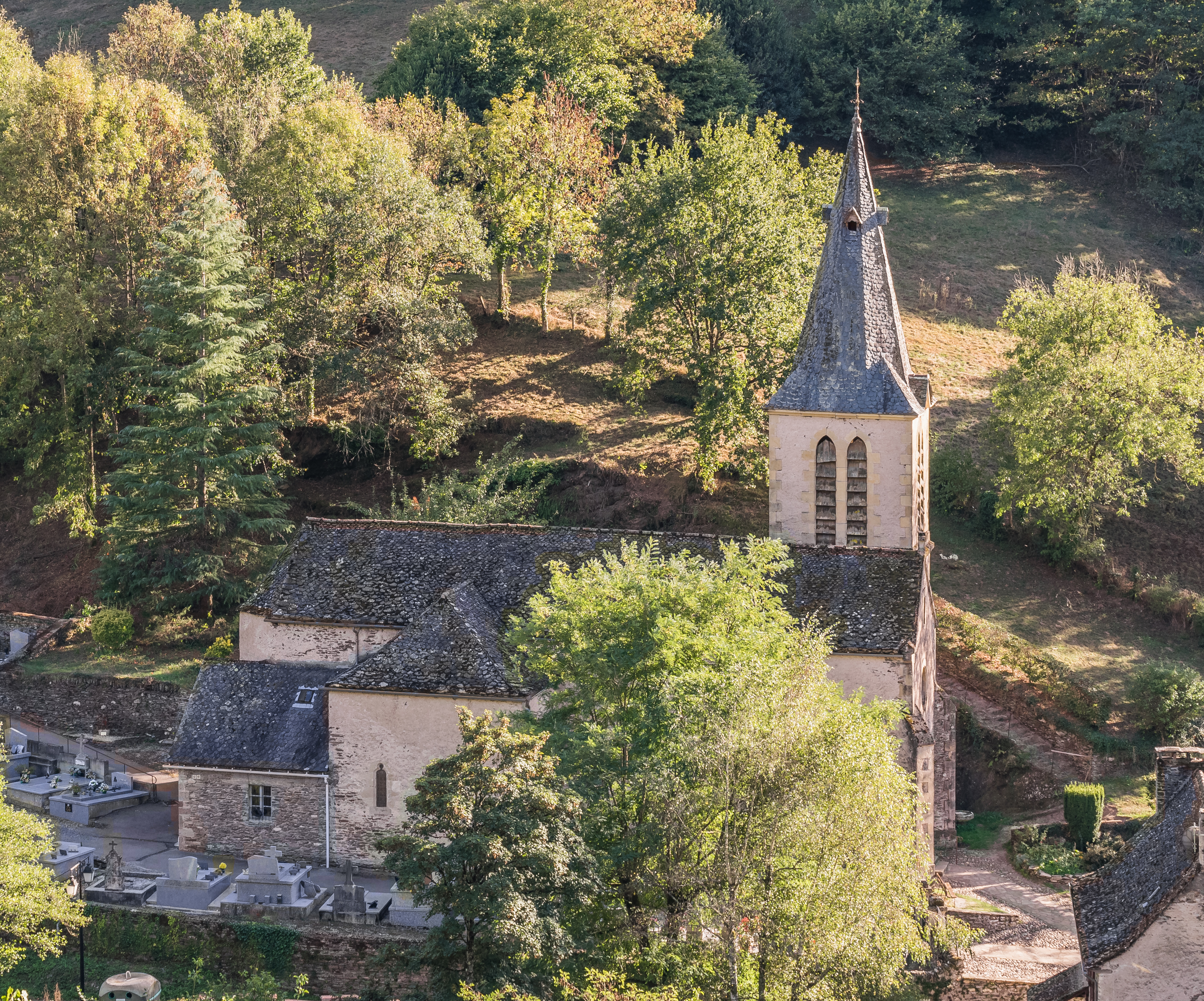
Saint Mary Magdalene church (Église Sainte-Marie-Madeleine)

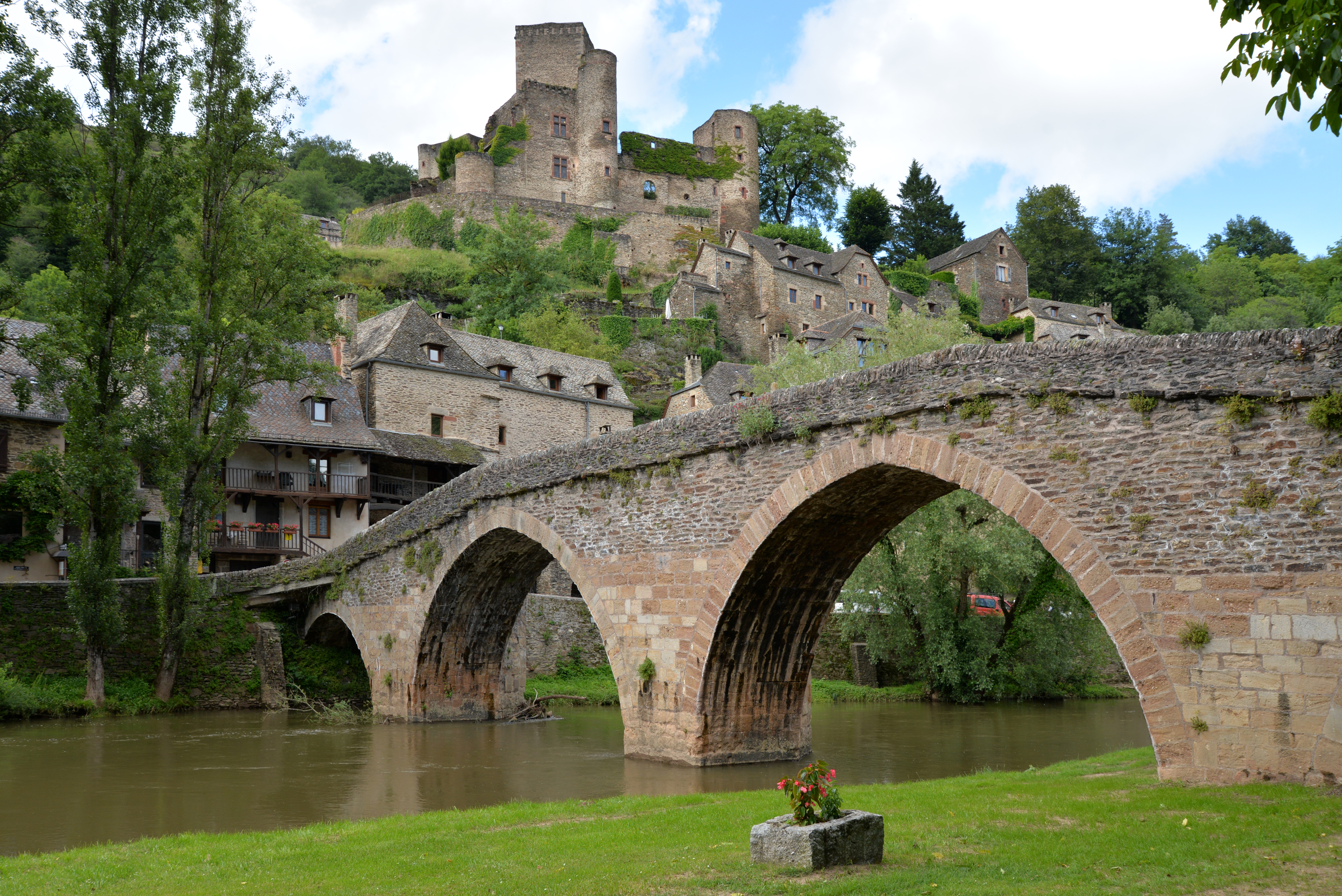
15th-century bridge (Vieux Pont)

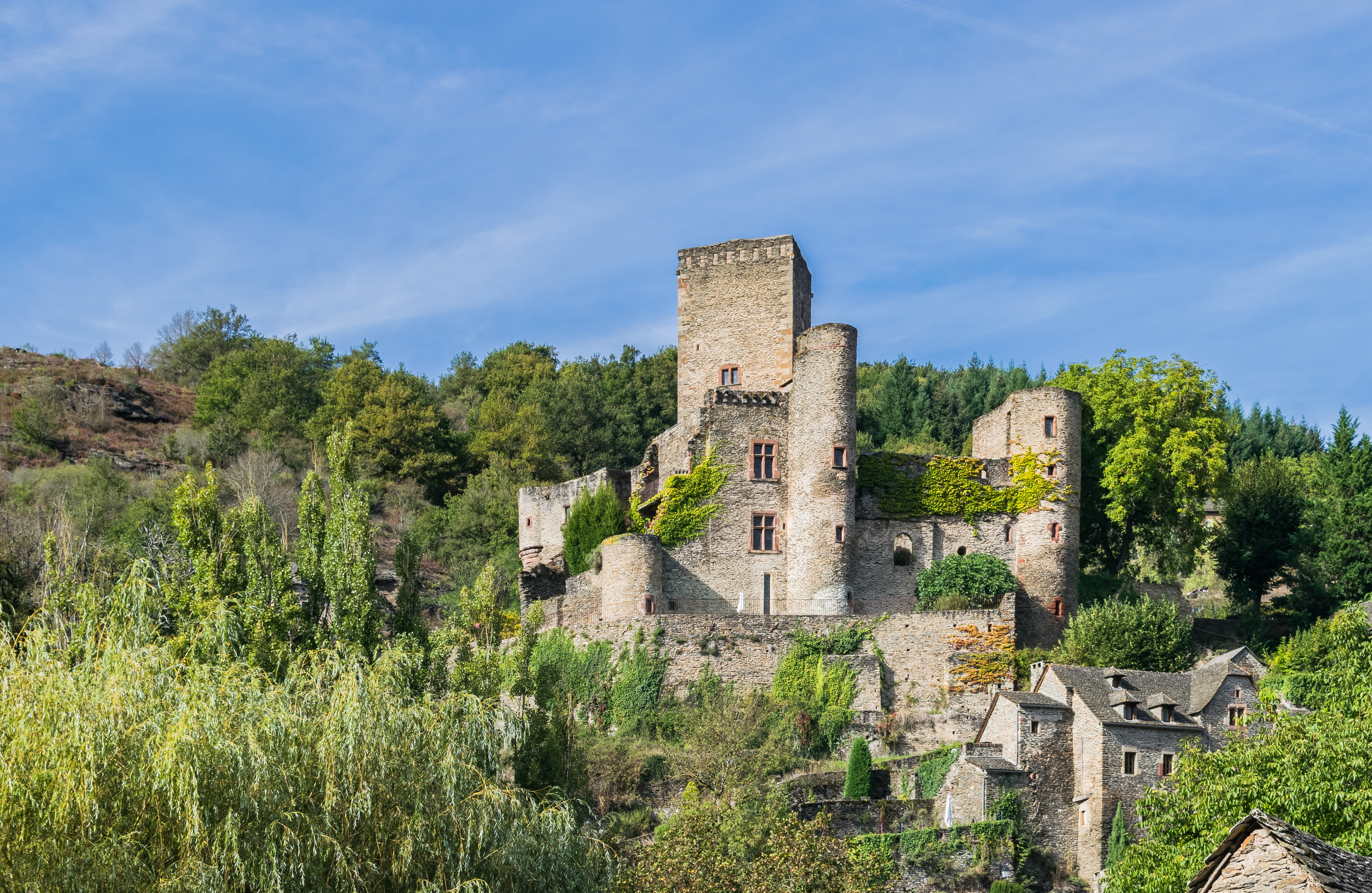
Château de Belcastel

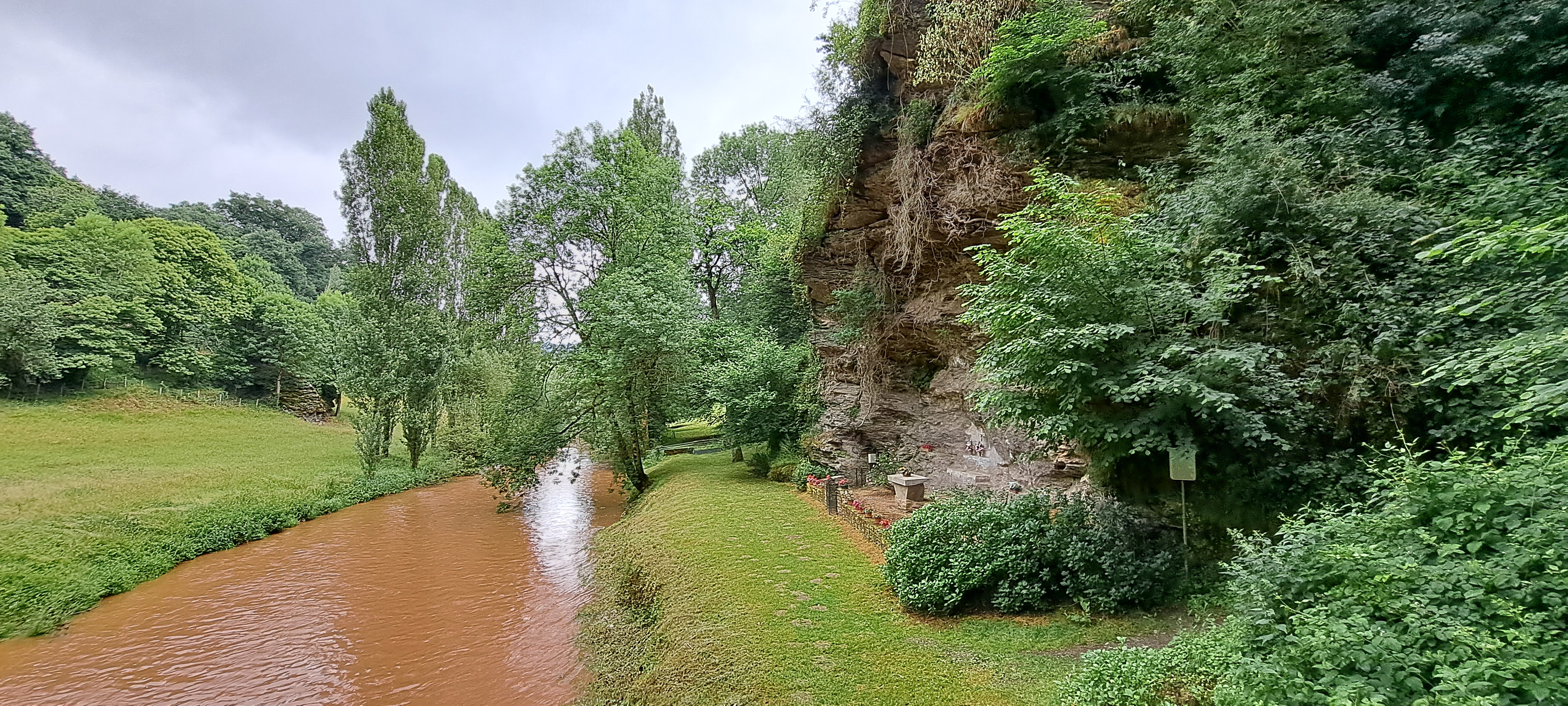
Le Lourdou on the river

== See also ==
- Communes of the Aveyron department
