= Cancon =

- Commune
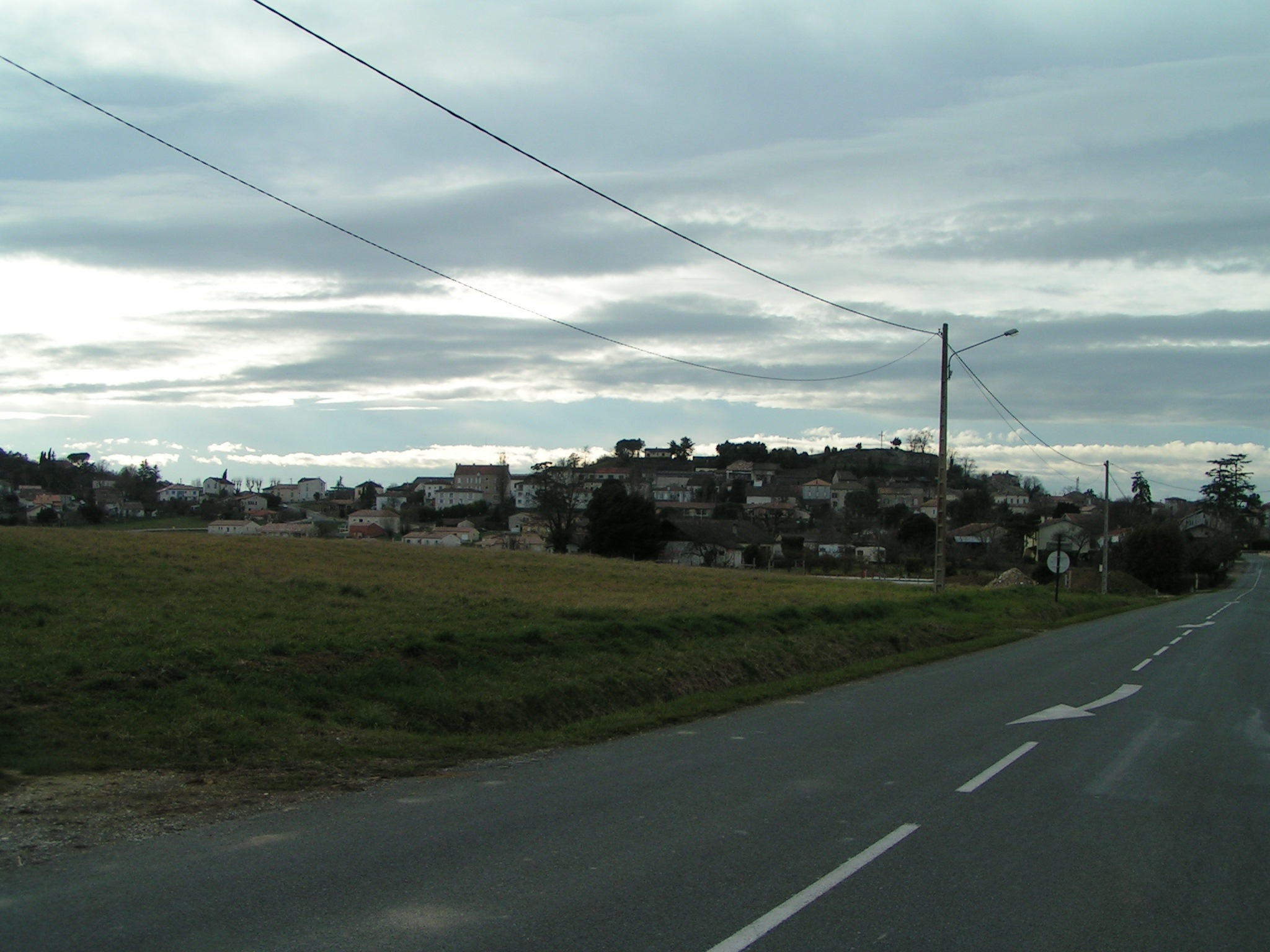
- A general view of Cancon

- Coat of arms
- Location of Cancon
- Location within France Location within Nouvelle-Aquitaine
- Coordinates: 44°32′12″N 0°37′35″E
- Country: France
- Region: Nouvelle-Aquitaine
- Department: Lot-et-Garonne
- Arrondissement: Villeneuve-sur-Lot
- Canton: Le Haut agenais Périgord
- Intercommunality: Bastides en Haut-Agenais Périgord

Government
  - Mayor (2020–2026): Elisabeth Pichard
- Area^{1}: 24.49 km^{2} (9.46 sq mi)
- Elevation: 175 m (574 ft)
- Highest elevation: 217 m (712 ft)
- Lowest elevation: 90 m (300 ft)
- Population (2023): 1,379
  - Density: 56.31/km^{2} (145.8/sq mi)
- Time zone: UTC+01:00 (CET)
  - Summer (DST): UTC+02:00 (CEST)
- INSEE/Postal code: 47048 /47290
- ^{1} French Land Register data, which excludes lakes, ponds, glaciers > 1 km^{2} (0.386 sq mi or 247 acres) and river estuaries.

Cancon (French pronunciation: [kɑ̃kɔ̃]; Occitan: Cancor) is a commune in the Lot-et-Garonne department in south-western France.

== See also ==
- Communes of the Lot-et-Garonne department
