= Accademia di Architettura di Mendrisio =

Coordinates: 45°52′02″N 8°59′05″E

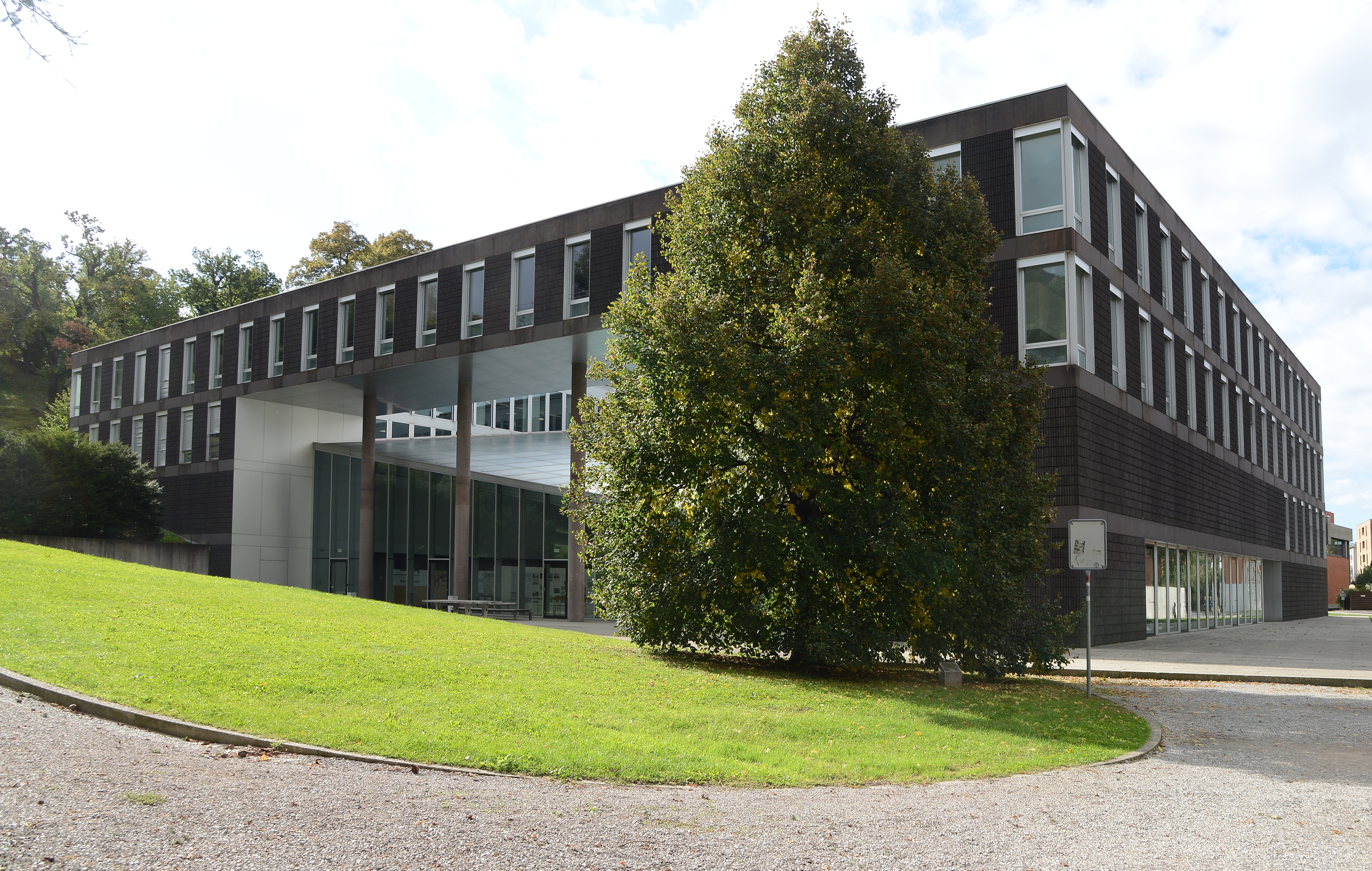
- Type: Public
- Established: 1996
- Director: Walter Angonese
- Academic staff: 100
- Students: 600
- Location: Mendrisio, Ticino, Switzerland
- Website: www.arc.usi.ch

The Accademia di Architettura di Mendrisio (AAM) is a Swiss school of architecture and is a founding unit of Università della Svizzera italiana (USI).

== History ==
The Accademia was founded in 1996 by Mario Botta, whose influences were Kenneth Frampton, Luigi Snozzi and Aurelio Galfetti.

== Notable faculty ==
=== Present ===
- Walter Angonese
- Valentin Bearth
- Riccardo Blumer
- Marc Collomb
- Yvonne Farrell
- Kersten Geers
- Jun'ya Ishigami
- Aires Mateus
- Shelley McNamara
- Quintus Miller
- Valerio Olgiati
- Muck Petzet

=== Emeritus ===
- Mario Botta
- Michele Arnaboldi
- Peter Zumthor

=== Former ===
- Francesco Dal Co
- François Charbonnet
- Angela Deuber
- Pascal Flammer
- Kenneth Frampton
- Nathan Ghiringhelli
- Romina Grillo
- François Grin
- Aurelio Galfetti
- Patrick Heiz
- Anne Holtrop
- Bijoy Jain
- Gilles Kepel
- Diébédo Francis Kéré
- Enrico Molteni
- Georg Nickisch
- Matteo Poli
- Maurus Schifferli
- Eduardo Souto de Moura
- Francesca Torzo
- Javier Miguel Verme
- Selina Walder
- Jonathan Woolf
- Philipp Wündrich
- Elia Zenghelis
- Raphael Zuber
