= Angela Deuber =

German architect (born 1975)

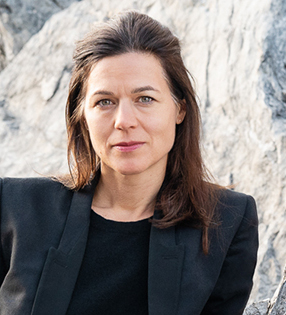
- Deuber in 2019
- Born: 1975 (age 50–51); Bad Kissingen, Germany
- Occupation: Architect
- Awards: ArcVision Prize (2015) Architecture Prize Concrete (2017)
- Buildings: Medieval House, Stuls (2012) Primary School, Thal (2013) Private House, Thusis (2019) Office Space, Zurich (2020) Atelier Space, Zurich (2021)
- Website: angeladeuber.com

Primary school, Thal, Switzerland

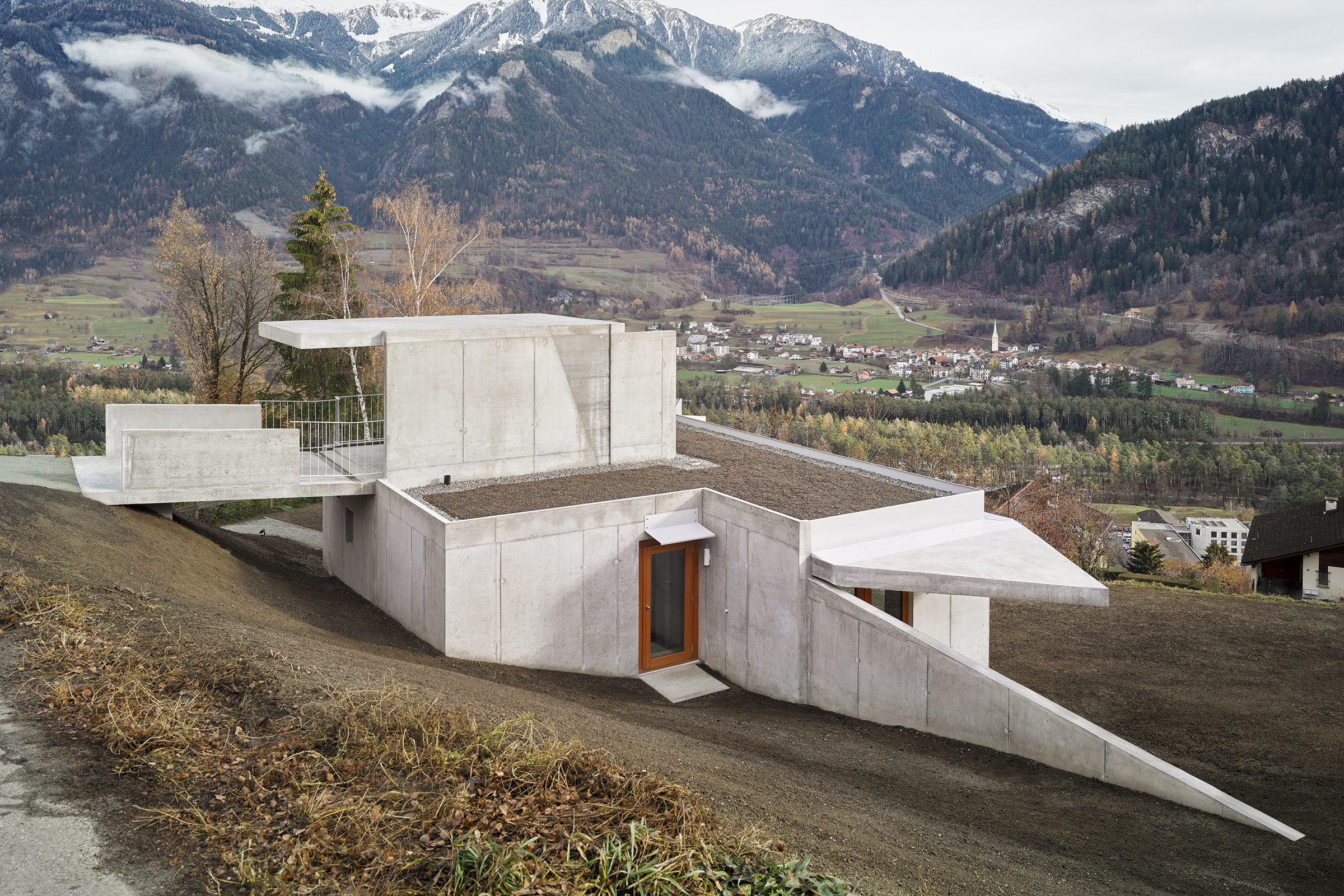
Private house, Thusis, Switzerland

Angela Deuber (born 1975 in Bad Kissingen) is a Swiss architect. She studied at ETH Zurich and has her office in Zurich. Deuber works on both regional and international projects, participates in exhibitions, and gives lectures and reviews.

The architecture of Deuber is described as relating to the architectonic nature of space and experience, where everything except the most basic architectonic elements should be intentionally removed in order to express the building's sculptural presence.

== Career ==
Deuber graduated in architecture from ETH Zurich in 2002. In 2006, she set up her office Angela Deuber Architects in Chur, which she relocated to Zurich in 2020.

Deuber's work includes the conversion of a house built in the Late Middle Ages in Stuls, Grisons, a school building in Thal, St. Gallen, and a private house in Thusis, Grisons.

In 2015, Deuber was awarded the arcVision Prize Women and Architecture which honors women with excellence and social responsibility in architecture. Of her win, the jury wrote:

"Angela Deuber is one of the youngest participants to have been nominated in this edition. In her work we have identified a new outlook for architecture; she successfully pinpoints important areas for structural research in construction and use of materials whilst encapsulating involvement and engagement of female architects in society".

In 2017, Deuber exhibited a fragmentary model of the Great Hypostyle Hall at the 2nd Chicago Architecture Biennial. The model is solid and represents the space between four pillars connected to part of the sky.

The same year, Deuber was the first woman to receive the Architekturpreis Beton, which honors architecturally outstanding buildings in concrete.

In 2018, Deuber was invited by Yvonne Farrell and Shelley McNamara to exhibit her work at the 16. Venice Biennale titled Freespace. In Deuber’s exhibition of eight projects, she showed how physical presence and spatial infinity are translated into architecture. She presented these projects in the form of analytiques – palimpsest-like drawings that merges and layers the varying scales of architectural drawing.

== Academia ==
Between 2007 and 2010, Deuber taught at the ETH Zurich in Switzerland. In 2012 she became a lecturer at the University of Lucerne, also in Switzerland. She is visiting professor at the Accademia di Architettura, Switzerland, at the Oslo School of Architecture and Design, Norway, and at the Swiss Federal Institute of Technology, Switzerland.

== Buildings ==
- 2012: Medieval House, Stuls, Switzerland
- 2013: Primary School, Thal, Switzerland with landscape architect Maurus Schifferli
- 2019: Private House, Thusis, Switzerland
- 2020: Office Space, Zurich, Switzerland
- 2021: Atelier Space, Zurich, Switzerland

== Proposals ==
- 2011: Swiss Chancellery, Nairobi, Kenya
- 2012: Palazzo del Cinema di Locarno, Locarno, Switzerland
- 2012–2014 Multi-purpose hall in Buochs, Switzerland (1st prize)
- 2013–2014: House in the Outer Hebrides, Isle of Harris, Scotland
- 2016: Museum in a Garden, Frohnau, Germany
- 2019: Hochhaus Krismer-Areal, Baden, Switzerland (1st prize)

== Awards ==
- 2015: arcVision Prize
- 2017: Architekturpreis Beton für Schulhaus Buechen, Staad
- 2020: Swiss Architectural Award (nomination)

== Exhibitions ==
- 2014: Young Swiss Public. London Metropolitan University.
- 2015: Island: 8 Houses for the Isle of Harris. The Lighthouse, Glasgow. With works from Raphael Zuber, Pascal Flammer, Angela Deuber, Johannes Norlander, Christ & Gantenbein, Neil Gillespie and Raumbureau. Curated by Samuel Penn and Penny Lewis.
- 2016: Schweizweit. Swiss Architecture Museum
- 2017: Make New History. Chicago Architecture Biennial
- 2018: 8 Works. Biennale Architettura
- 2018: 44 Low-Resolution Houses. Princeton University

== Publications ==
- Penn, Samuel. Island: 8 Houses for the Isle of Harris, Outer Hebrides. AE Foundation 2014. ISBN 978-0993080401.
- Deuber, Angela. 8 Works. Self-published 2018.
- Penn, Samuel. Accounts. Pelinu Books 2019. ISBN 978-973-0-29787-4.
- Angela Deuber Atelier (Ed.). Leaves. Jungle Books 2023. ISBN 978-3-9525726-5-8.
