= Roger Boltshauser =

Swiss architect (born 1964)

Roger Boltshauser (born 1964) is a Swiss architect and professor at the ETH Zurich.

== Biography ==
Roger Boltshauser was born in 1964 in Zürich. He studied architecture at the Lucerne University of Applied Sciences and Arts between 1988 and 1990 and at the ETH Zurich between 1991 and 1995. After graduating, he founded an architectural practice in Zurich in 1996 and worked as a research assistant at the Institute for the History and Theory of Architecture at gta Verlag. In 2007, he was appointed to the Association of Swiss Architects. Boltshauser taught as a design assistant at Lucerne University of Applied Sciences and Arts (1990–1991), as a design assistant to guest lecturer Peter Märkli at ETH Zurich and EPF Lausanne (1997–1999), as a lecturer at the University of Applied Sciences HTW Chur (2004–2010), as a lecturer at the Hochschule Anhalt Dessau DIA in the Studio Chur Institute of Architecture (2005–2009), as an expert in design and construction at the Lucerne University of Applied Sciences and Arts (2011–2014), as a visiting professor at the EPF Lausanne (2016–2017) and at the Technical University of Munich (2017). He has been teaching as a guest lecturer since 2018 and as a professor at ETH Zurich since 2024.

== Principal works ==
- 2001–2002: Extension of the Sihlhölzli Sports Complex, Zurich
- 2003–2007: Hirzenbach Residential High-Rise, Zurich
- 2004–2008: House Rauch, Schlins together with Martin Rauch
- 2008–2012: Pavilion school Gönhard, Aarau together with landscape architect Maurus Schifferli
- 2009–2012: School Pavilion Allenmoos II, Zurich
- 2010–2020: Research Building GLC ETH Zurich, Zurich
- 2013–2017: Renovation of garden and rectory, Trub together with landscape architect Maurus Schifferli
- 2011–2019: Europaallee – Construction field F, Zurich
- 2006–2018: Area Hirzenbach, Zurich together with landscape architect Maurus Schifferli
- 2014–2018: Krämeracker Primary School, Uster
- 2017–2018: Mock-up Sitterwerk, Saint Gallen
- 2016–2021: Office and infrastructure building Wasserwerke Zug WWZ together with landscape architect Maurus Schifferli
- 2017–2021: Kiln Tower for the Brickworks Museum, Cham

== Awards ==
- 1995: Willi-Studer-Prize from ETH Zurich for the best diploma thesis
- 2008: Austrian Building Owner Award for House Rauch
- 2011: Award - Gutes Bauen Ostschweiz 2006-2010 for the renovation of the town hall, St. Gallen
- 2012: Bronze Hare for school building, Allenmoos
- 2013: Federal Monument Award for the Gönhard school complex, Aarau
- 2014: Fritz Höger Prize for the conversion of Atelierhaus Dubsstrasse, Zurich
- 2014: Ernst A. Plischke Prize for House Rauch
- 2016: Good Buildings Award of the City of Zurich for Allenmoos II school pavilion, Zurich

== Literature ==
- a.mag 29 Raphael Zuber I Roger Boltshauser I Lilitt Bollinger. 2022
- El Croquis 209 Roger Boltshauser 2002–2021
- Roger Boltshauser, Martin Tschanz: Roger Boltshauser - 1996–2021. Triest Verlag, Zürich 2021, ISBN 978-3-03863-057-9.
- Studio Jan de Vylder, ETH Zurich (ed.): carrousel confessions confusion, set 2 / zines 1–3. Koenig Books, London 2020, ISBN 978-3-96098-502-0.
- Jésus Vassallo (ed.): Seamless - Digital Collage And Dirty Realism In Architecture. Park Books, Zürich 2017, ISBN 978-3-03860-019-0.
- Ulrich Müller (ed.): Roger Boltshauser / Transformator. Wasmuth & Zohlen, Tübingen 2012, ISBN 978-3-8030-0761-2.
- Otto Kapfinger, Axel Simon (ed.): Haus Rauch. House Rauch. The Rauch House. A Model of Advanced Clay Architecture. A Model of Advanced Clay Architecture. Roger Boltshauser. Martin Rauch. With contributions by Roger Boltshauser, Thomas Kamm, Otto Kapfinger, Marta Rauch-Debevec, Martin Rauch, Axel Simon, Andrea Wiegelmann. Birkhäuser Verlag, Basel 2010, ISBN 978-3-0346-0109-2.
- Aita Flury & Roger Boltshauser (ed.): Elementares zum Raum. Roger Boltshauser Works. Springer, Vienna New York 2008, ISBN 978-3-99043-213-6.
- Roger Boltshauser, Cyril Veillon, Nadja Maillard (eds.): Pisé. Rammed earth - tradition and potential. Published in German, English, French. Triest Verlag, Zürich, ISBN 978-3-03863-027-2.
