= School of architecture of Nancy =

Architecture school in Nancy, France

Coordinates: 48°41′45.5″N 6°11′34″E

Location
- 2 Rue Bastien-Lepage, 54000 Nancy, France

Information
- Founder: Livio Vacchini
- Gender: Any
- Classes offered: Architecture
- Language: French
- Website: https://www.eaae.be/school/ecole-nationale-superieure-darchitecture-de-nancy/
- Last updated: 2024-08-12

The school of architecture of Nancy (French: École nationale supérieure d'architecture de Nancy, also called EAN or National School of Architecture of Nancy) is one of the twenty public schools of architecture in France, located at 2 rue Bastien-Lepage in Nancy. Created in 1969 by Livio Vacchini, the school has depended on the French ministry for the Culture and the Communication since 1996.

The school accepts foreigners, with different procedures to enroll based on if they are in France, the EU, or neither. The school speaks French, and offers a paid French language proficiency test (French abbreviation: TCF DAP), alongside other French universities, which is typically held in January.

== The building ==
The building is the work of the late Swiss architect Livio Vacchini, but the location of the building was chosen by the French architect Alexandre Chemetoff. It has a wheelchair-accessible entrance, as it has a small ramp that leads up to the outside platform.
