= Maurus Schifferli =

Swiss landscape architect (born 1973)

Maurus Schifferli (born 11 January 1973, Wilderswil) is a Swiss landscape architect and professor.

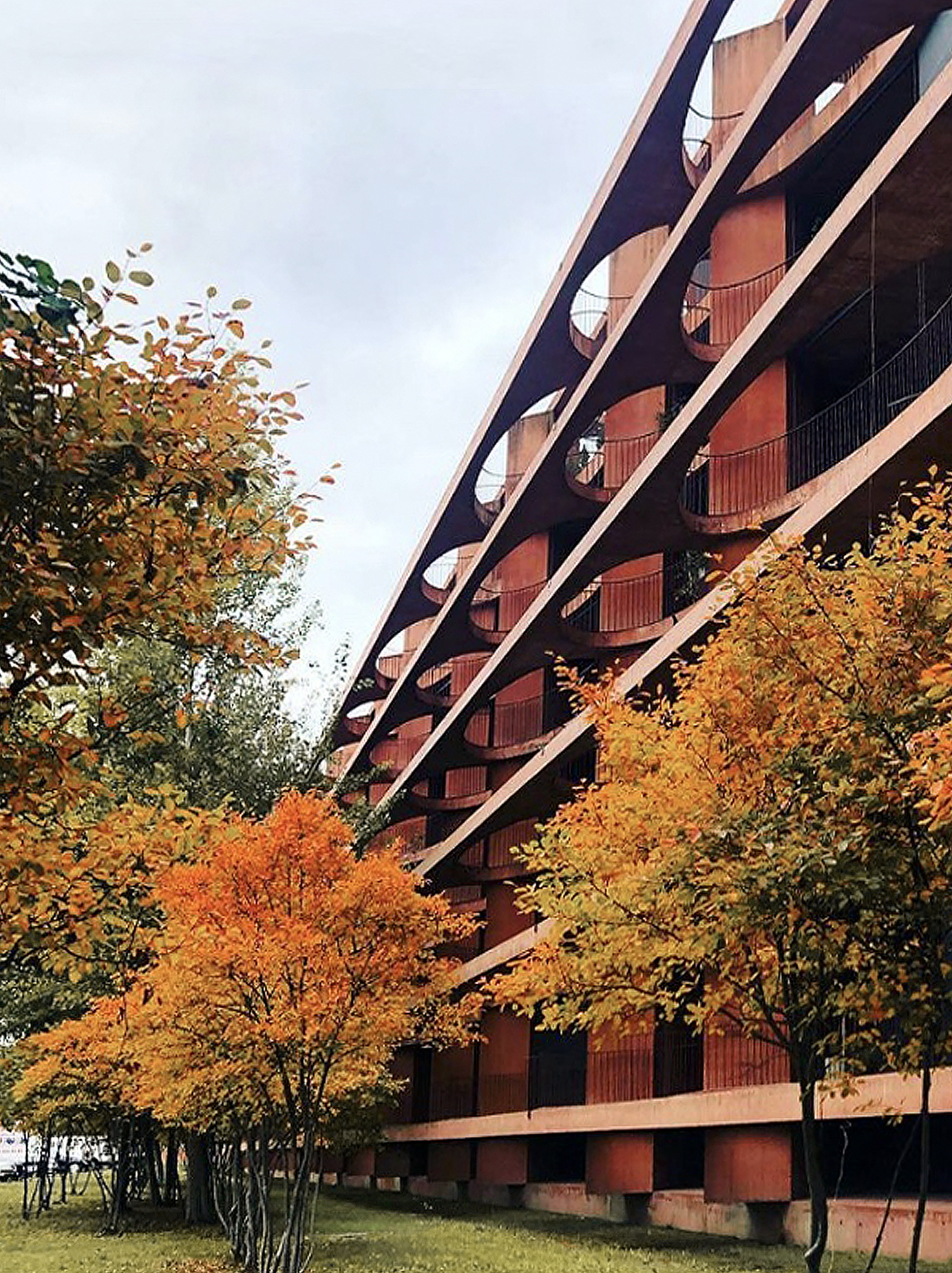
Zug-Schleife, Zug

== Biography ==
Maurus Schifferli completed a four-year apprenticeship as a landscape architect with Kienast Vogt Partner in Zurich and Bern in 1994, and studied landscape architecture at the Eastern Switzerland University of Applied Sciences in Rapperswil from 1995 to 2000. In 1999, he worked at the Büro für Gestaltung in Munich and founded the landscape architecture firm 4d in Bern with Simon Schöni in 2000 and his own landscape architecture firm in 2014, which has offices in Bern and Basel. Maurus Schifferli is a member of the SIA. Schifferli taught under Eberhard Stauss at the Academy of Fine Arts Munich (1999), under Valerio Olgiati at the Accademia di Architettura di Mendrisio (2002), at the University of Applied Sciences Erfurt (2005), at the Bern University of Applied Sciences Burgdorf (2005–2017), under Raphael Zuber at ETH Zurich (2018) and since 2025 at the Karlsruhe Institute of Technology.

== Principal works ==
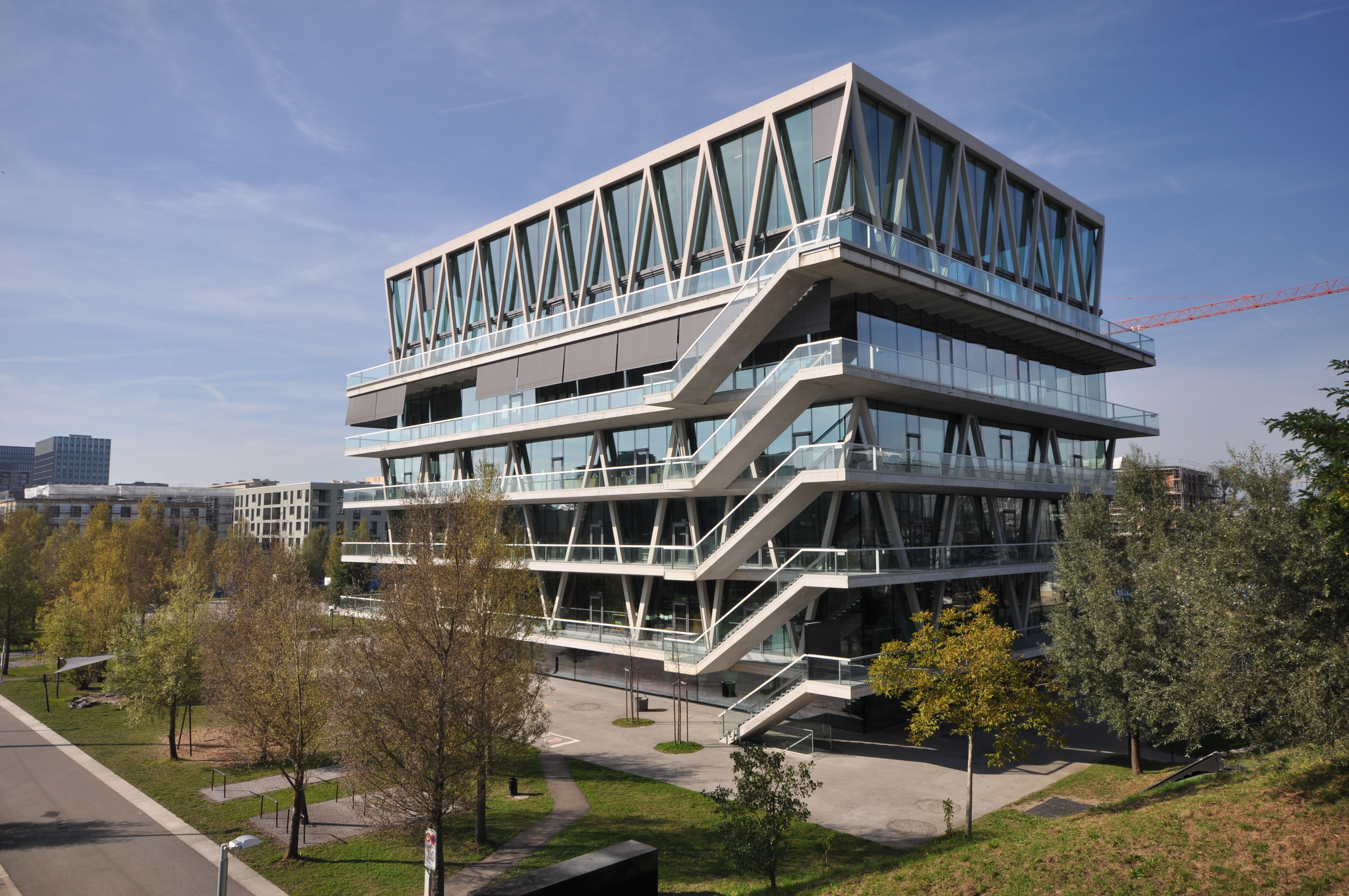
Schoolhouse Leutschenbach, Zurich

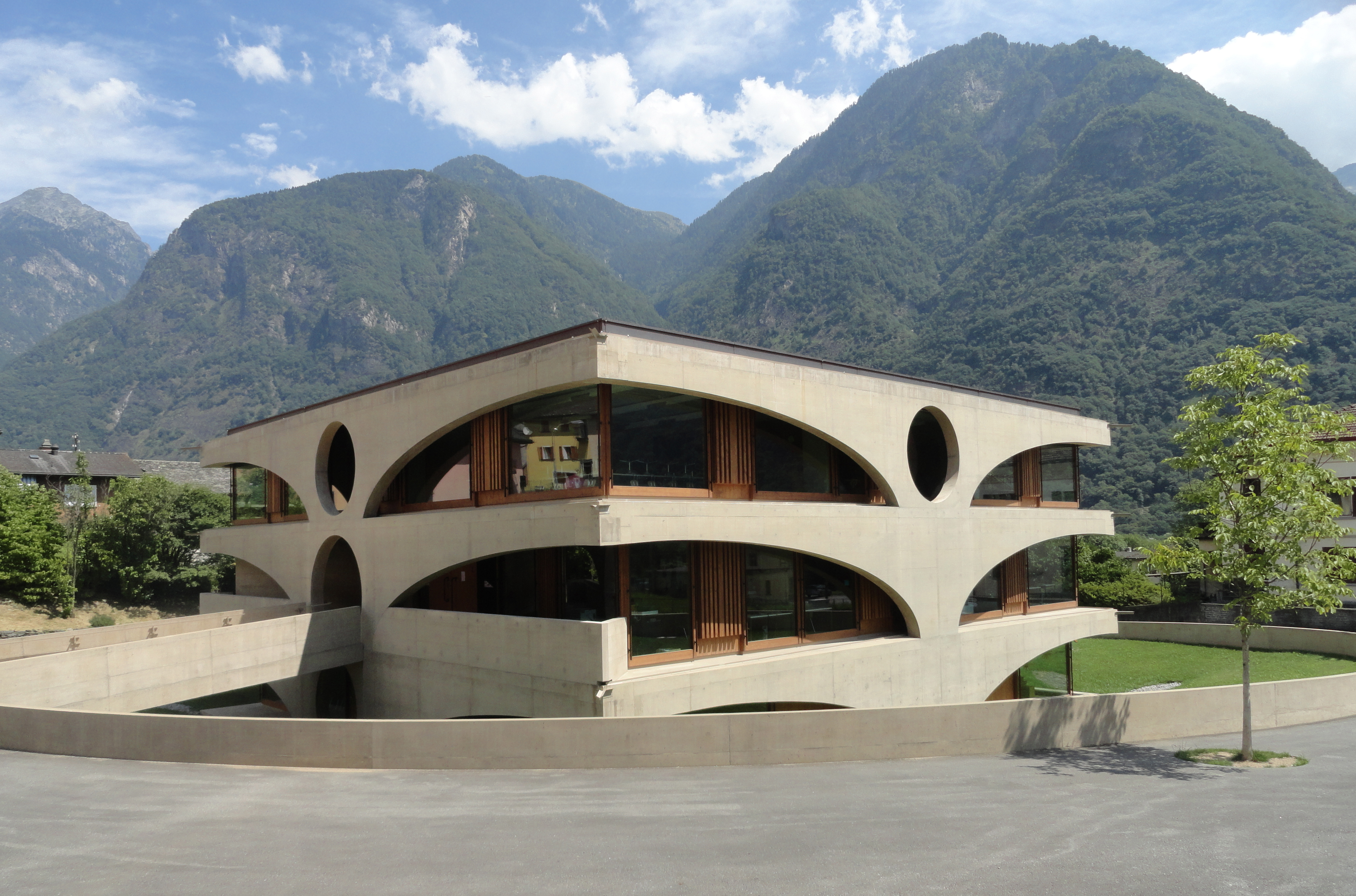
Schoolhouse Grono

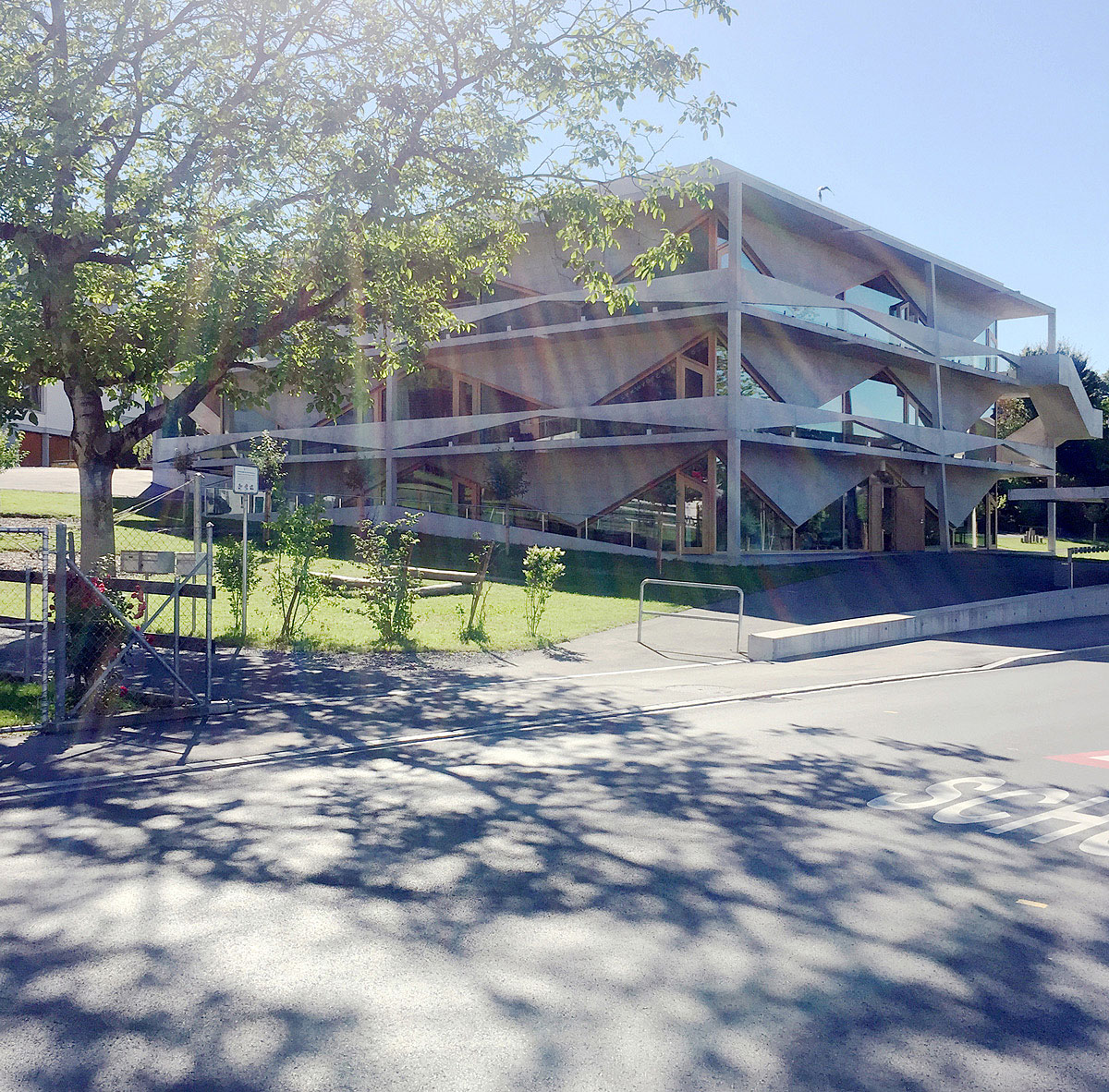
Schoolhouse Thal

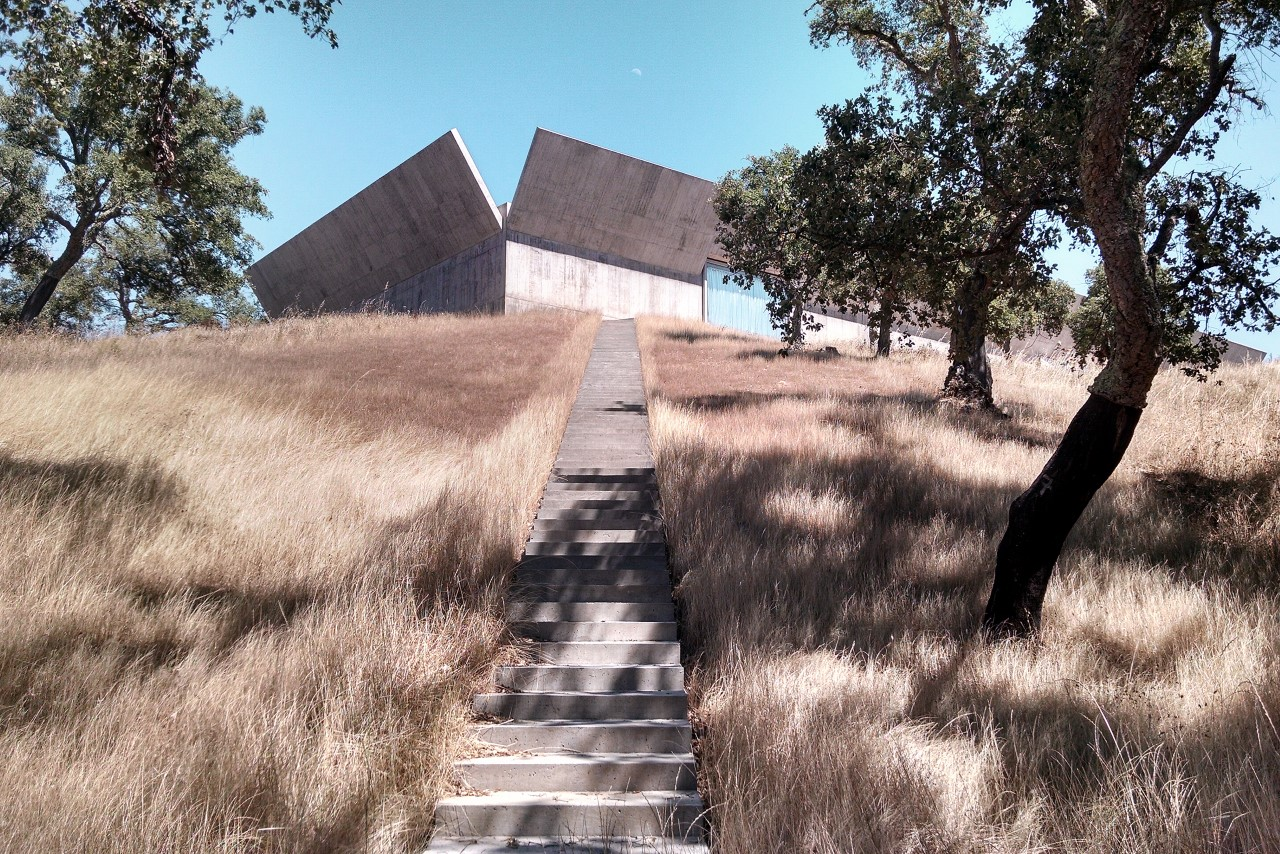
Villa Além, Alentejo

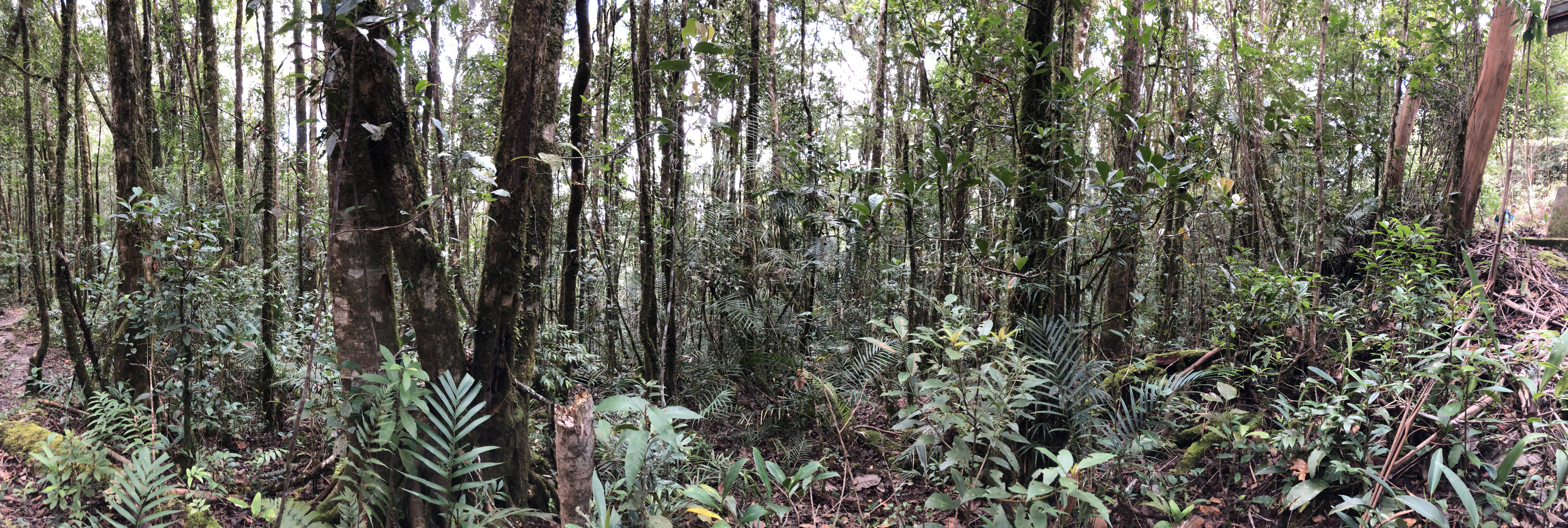
Landscape repair, Borneo

- 2000–02: Lido, Biel
- 2003–05: Gardens of the Hôtel de Ville and Hôtel de la Poste, Sierre
- 2004–09: Schoolhouse Leutschenbach, Zurich (architect: Christian Kerez and engineer Joseph Schwartz)
- 2006–11: Zug-Schleife, Zug (Architektur: Valerio Olgiati and engineers Conzett Bronzini Gartmann)
- 2007–11: Schoolhouse Grono (Architektur: Raphael Zuber and engineers Conzett Bronzini Gartmann)
- 2008–12: Extension Pavillon School Gönhard, Aarau (architect: Roger Boltshauser)
- 2009–13: Schoolhouse Thal (architect: Angela Deuber and engineers Conzett Bronzini Gartmann)
- 2014: Villa Além, Alentejo (architect: Valerio Olgiati)
- 2015: Rectory, Trub (architect: Roger Boltshauser)
- 2016–21: Office and infrastructure building Wasserwerke Zug WWZ (architect: Roger Boltshauser)
- 2019–24: Thürwachterhaus, Ingolstadt (architects: BÜRO MÜHLBAUER)
- 2018–25: House with two courtyards, Bad Kötzting (architects: BÜRO MÜHLBAUER)
- 2018–26: Swimming pool Gossau, St. Gallen (architect: Raphael Zuber and engineers Ferrari Gartmann)
- since 2021: Charité Center, Berlin (architects: Silvia Gmür Reto Gmür)
- since 2021: Extension Charité Campus Benjamin Franklin, Berlin (architects: Silvia Gmür Reto Gmür)

Designs:

- 2002: School building Freudenberg, Zurich (architect: Christian Kerez and engineer Joseph Schwartz)
- 2005–06: Werkbundsiedlung Wiesenfeld, Munich (architect: Christian Kerez and engineer Joseph Schwartz)
- 2012: SUPSI university, Mendrisio (architect: Raphael Zuber)
- 2012: Funeral chapel, Steinhausen (architect: Raphael Zuber)
- 2012 School building Erlenmatt, Basel (architect: Raphael Zuber)
- 2017: Urban Housing, Wil (architect: Pascal Flammer)
- 2021: Beiertheimer Allee office building, Karlsruhe (architect: Valerio Olgiati)
- 2021: University Campus, St. Gallen (architect: Pascal Flammer)

== Awards ==
- 2005: Silver Hare for Jardins de l'Hôtel de Ville et de l'Hôtel de la Poste, Sierre
- 2005: Wakker Prize for new SBB regional railway stations, Zäziwil
- 2007: Travel grant from the Canton of Bern for fine arts and architecture - study of the position and work of Geoffrey Bawa in Sri Lanka
- 2009: Gold Hare for the Leutschenbach school building, Zurich
- 2013: Federal Monument Award for the renovation and extension of the Gönhard Pavilion School, Aarau
- 2013: Graubünden award for good buildings for Grono school building
- 2014: Wakker Prize for the renovation and extension of the Gönhard Pavilion School, Aarau
- 2015: Award for good buildings in the canton of Zug 2006-2015 for Zug-Schleife, Zug
- 2015: Bronze Hare for Europaplatz, Bern
- 2016: Award for good buildings in the city of Zurich 2011-2015 for the Grünmatt housing estate of FGZ, Zurich
- 2017: Concrete Architecture Prize for the Buechen Thal school building
- 2017: Hare in silver for the rectory garden, Trub
- Garden of the Sierre town hall is a listed building in Sierre

== Literature ==
- Maurus Schifferli (ed.): Strategies of Landscape Architecture. About Bocks, Zurich/Berlin, 2022 with contributions by Markus Peter and Christoph Schläppi
- Maurus Schifferli and Simon Schöni (eds.): 4d Landschaftsarchitekten. Edition Dino Simonett, Zurich 2013 with photographs by Milo Keller and a contribution by Christoph Schläppi, design: Dino Simonett, Bruno Margreth

Contributions

- Time Space Existence, "Biennale di Venezia". Contribution by Maurus Schifferli: Beyound Object and Abstraction, 2018
