= Silvia Gmür =

Swiss architect (1939–2022)

- Born: 17 September 1939; Zürich, Switzerland
- Died: 24 January 2022 (aged 82); Riehen, Switzerland
- Education: ETH Zurich
- Occupation: Architect

Silvia Gmür (17 September 1939 – 24 January 2022) was a Swiss architect.

After earning a degree from ETH Zurich in 1964, she worked in Paris, London, and New York City with Mitchell-Giurgola from 1966 to 1972. That year, she founded her own agency in Basel and partnered with Livio Vacchini from 1995 to 2001.

Gmür was also a professor at ETH Zurich from 1979 to 1985.

An exhibition of her projects was displayed at the Harvard Graduate School of Design in 2014, the same year in which a similar exhibition was held at the Galerie d'Architecture in Paris.

== Buildings ==
- 1977–1979: House and Atelierhouse Gmür, Riehen with ingenieure Pierre Beurret

Together with Livio Vacchini:

- 1995–1998: Three Houses, Beinwil am See
- 1993–2000: Bedhouse D – Cantonal hospital Grisons, Chur-Masans
- 2002: University Hospital Basel, extension Klinikum 1 west

Together with Reto Gmür:

- 2012: Cantonal hospital St. Gallen, institute for Rechtsmedizin and Pathologie
- 2021: Citizens' Hospital Solothurn
- since 2021: Charité Center, Berlin with landscape architect Maurus Schifferli
- since 2021: Extension Charité Campus Benjamin Franklin, Berlin with landscape architect Maurus Schifferli

== Awards ==
- Progressive Architecture Award (1977)
- Prix Meret-Oppenheim (2011)
