= Aurelio Galfetti =

Swiss architect (1936–2021)

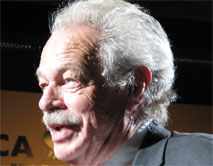
Aurelio Galfetti

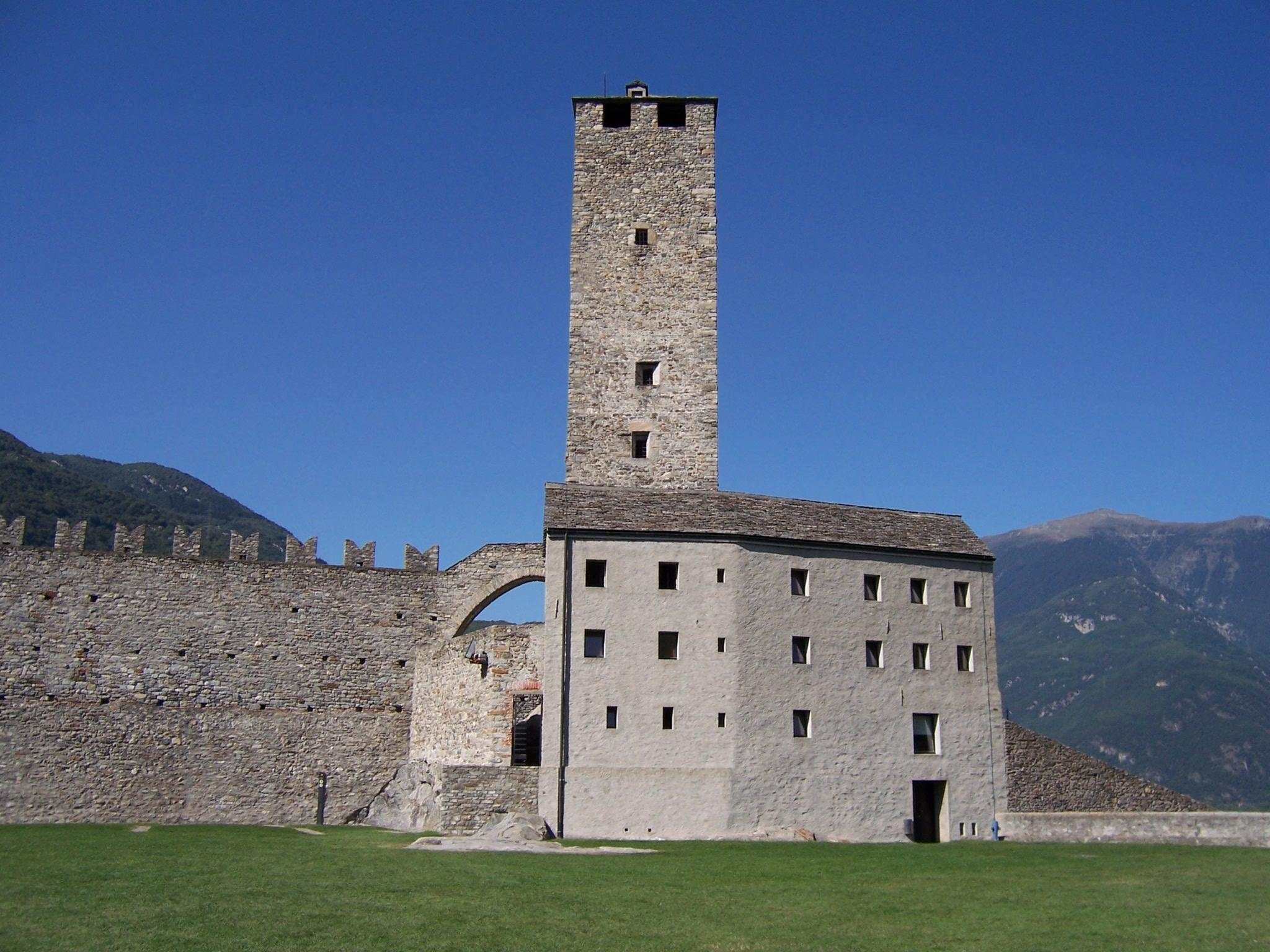
Castelgrande, Bellinzona

Aurelio Galfetti (2 April 1936 – 5 December 2021) was a Swiss architect.

== Biography ==
Galfetti was born in Biasca, Ticino, on 2 April 1936. Together with Mario Botta, Luigi Snozzi, and Livio Vacchini, he is one of the foremost 20th-century architects from the Canton of Ticino.

One of his most important works was the renovation of Castelgrande at Bellinzona.

Galfetti died on 5 December 2021, at the age of 85. His nephew is Manuel Valls, former prime minister of France.

== Trivia ==
Galfetti's sister, the actress Luisangela Galfetti, was married to the Catalan painter Xavier Valls.

== Works ==
- Casa Rotalinti, 1961, Bellinzona
- Kindergarten in Biasca, 1963–64, Biasca
- Kindergarten, 1966, 1969–70, Lugano
- Städtisches Freibad, 1967–70, Bellinzona
- Kindergarten, 1969–71, Bedano
- School centre, 1972, Riva San Vitale
- School, 1972–75, Ascona
- Main post office, 1981–85, Bellinzona
- House Al Portone, 1984–85, Bellinzona
- Tennis courts, 1985–86, Bellinzona
- Leonardo residential building, 1986, Lugano
- Houses Bianco e Nero, 1986, Bellinzona
- Ferreti House, 1988, Gravesano
- Transformation of Castelgrande, 1983–89, Bellinzona
- Mediatheque, 1989–90, Chambéry
- Bâtiment Ulysse, 1991–94, Lausanne
- Aula polivalente, Università della Svizzera italiana (USI), 1999–2002, Lugano
- Net Center, 2006, Padua

== Sources ==
- Brown-Manrique, Gerardo: The Ticino Guide. New York: Princeton Architectural Press, 1989 (ISBN 0-910413-46-0).
