= Jonathan Woolf =

British architect

- Born: 13 February 1961; Golders Green, London, England
- Died: 4 September 2015 (aged 54)
- Education: Kingston Polytechnic
- Occupation: Architect
- Spouse: Siobhan Woolf
- Children: 2
- Practice: Jonathan Woolf Architects

Jonathan Woolf (13 February 1961 – 4 September 2015) was a British architect.

== Early life ==
He was born in London and educated at Kingston School of Architecture at Kingston University before apprenticing at practices in Rome and later in London, where he was project architect for the house of art collector Charles Saatchi.

== Jonathan Woolf Architects ==
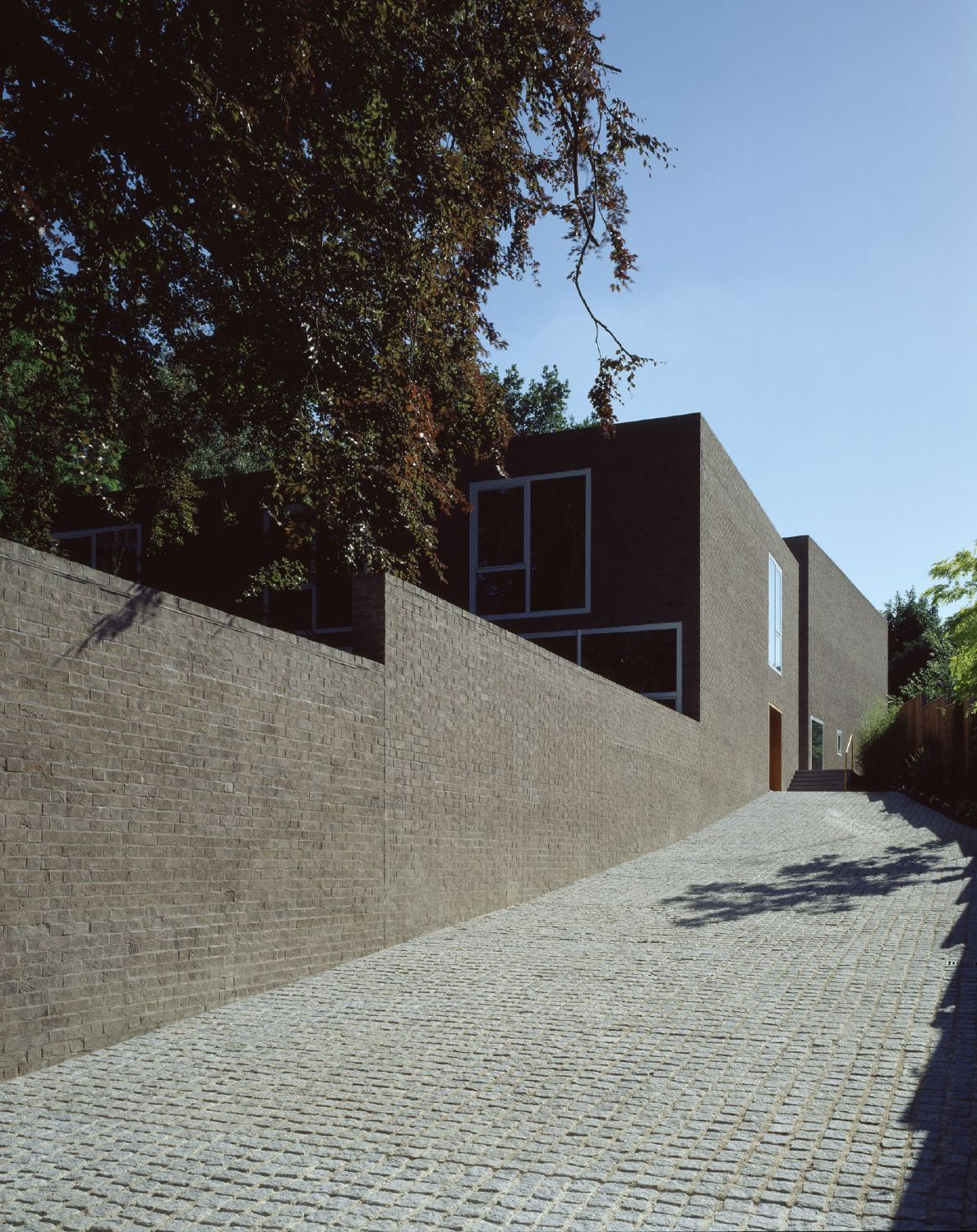
Brick Leaf House, South-East facade.

In 1991 he established his own practice. In 2003 the practice completed Brick Leaf House in Hampstead, North London, which received a RIBA Award and a Civic Trust Award, and became the first private building to reach the mid-list of the UK Stirling Prize. Building Design hailed Brick Leaf House as "a statement of real capacity" and in 2004 honoured the practice with the Building Design Architect of the Year Award. Grand Designs presenter Kevin McCloud chose Brick Leaf House as one of his "twenty perfect houses."

== Recognition ==
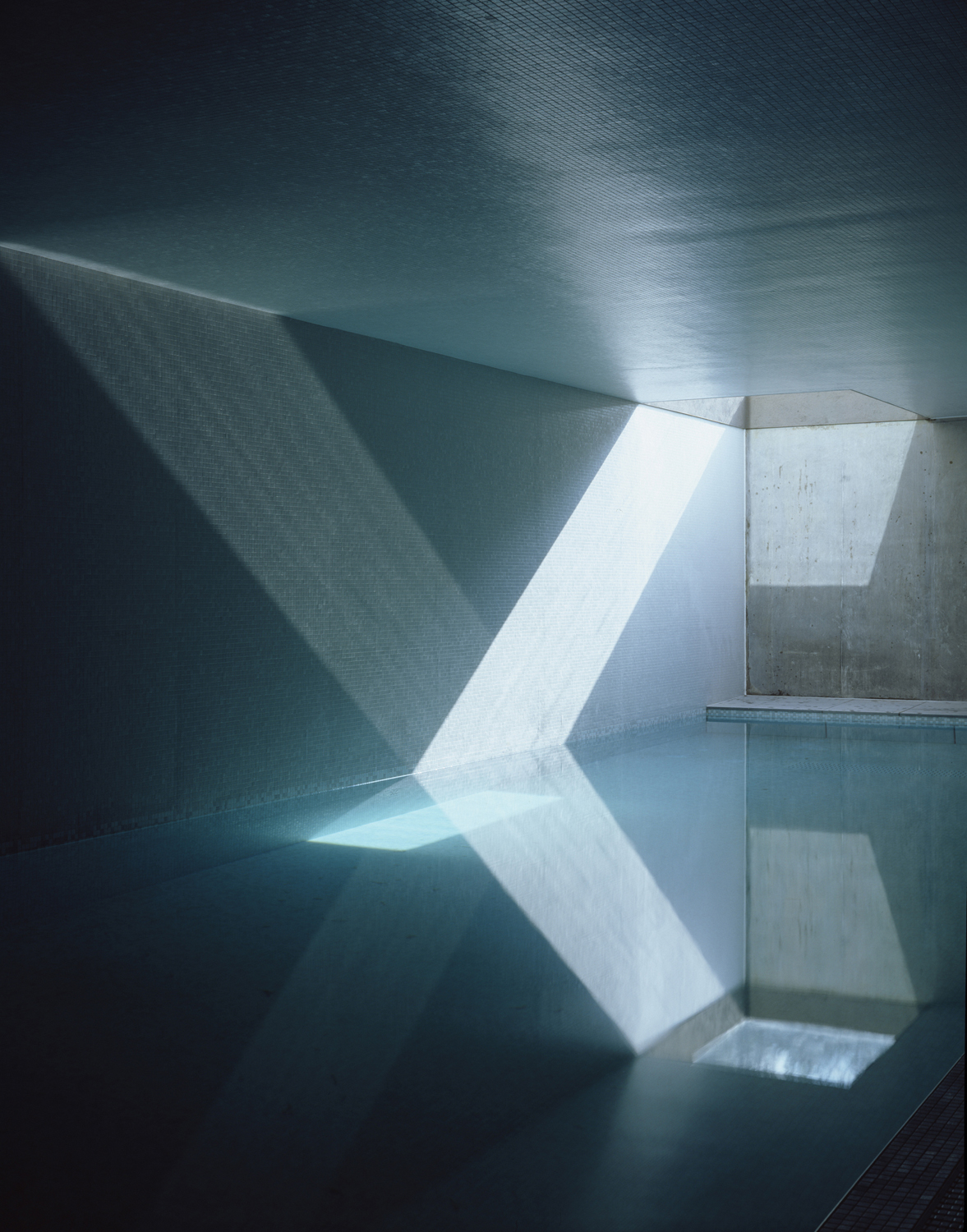
Brick Leaf House - Pool

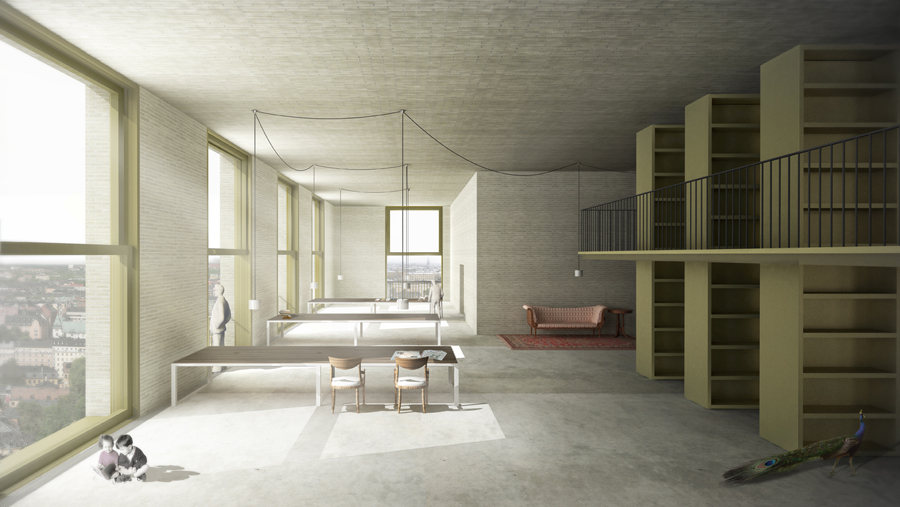
Stockholm City Library Competition - Interior view. Received an Honorary mention and 7th place of the international competition to extend Eric Gunnar Asplund’s Library

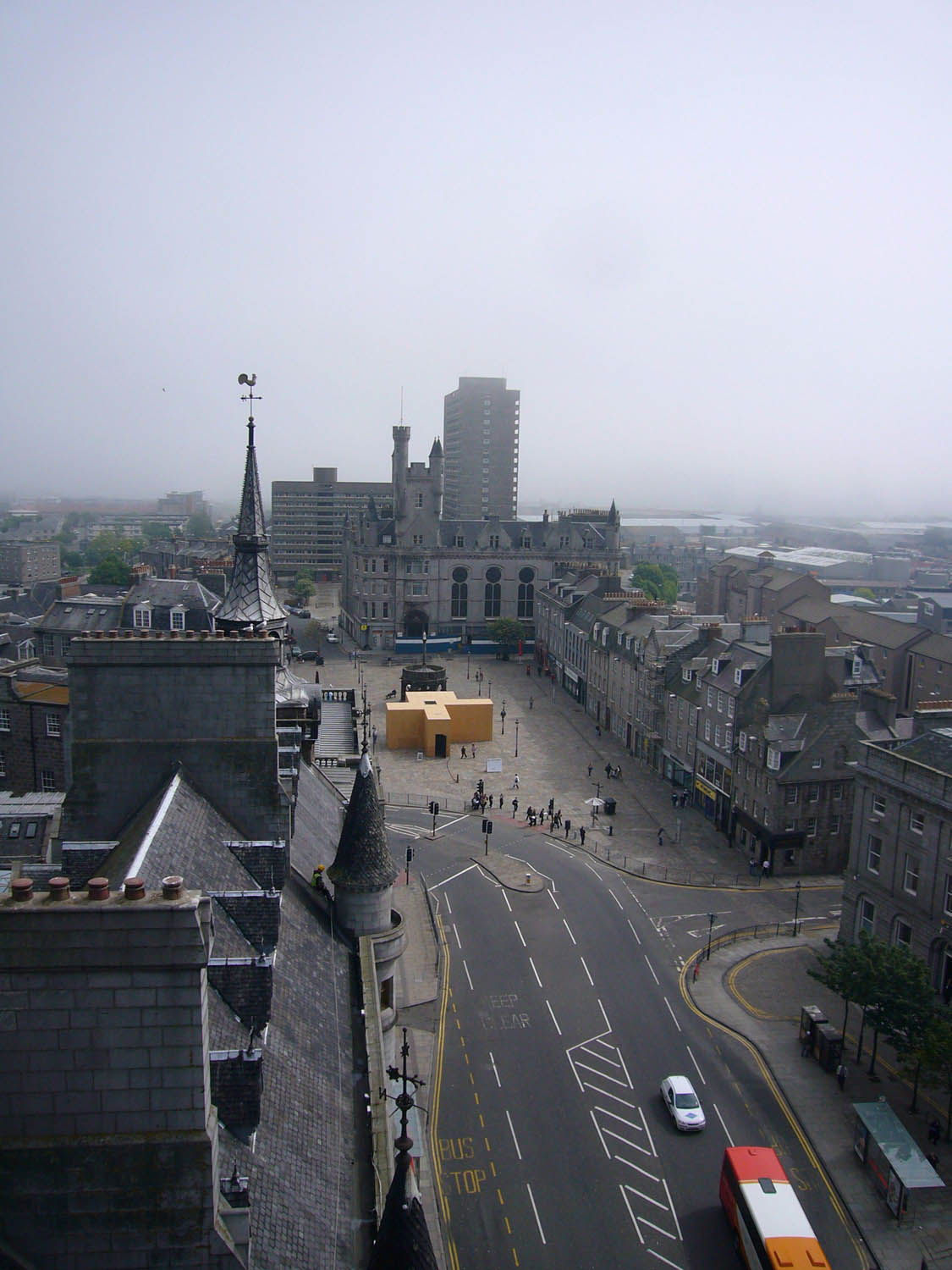
Monkey Puzzle Pavilion

The practice won international competitions in Milan for furniture and in Dublin for urban regeneration and in 2007 received an Honorary mention and 7th place amongst the 1,170 entries of the international competition to extend Eric Gunnar Asplund’s 1930s Stockholm City Library. His Brick Leaf House (Double House) received RIBA and Civic Trust Awards in 2004.

== Notable projects ==
- Ijaz Apartment, London, 1991
- The Lion Rooms, London, 1993
- Ziggurat Studio, London, 1993 & 1998
- Pocket House, London, 1998
- Brick Leaf House, Hampstead, London, 2003;
- Mayfair Offices, London, 2006
- Two Mayfair Penthouses, London, 2007
- Monkey Puzzle Pavilion, Aberdeen, Scotland, 2007
- Bloomsbury Apartments, London, 2008
- Painted House, London, 2009
- Lost Villa, 2014

== Gallery ==
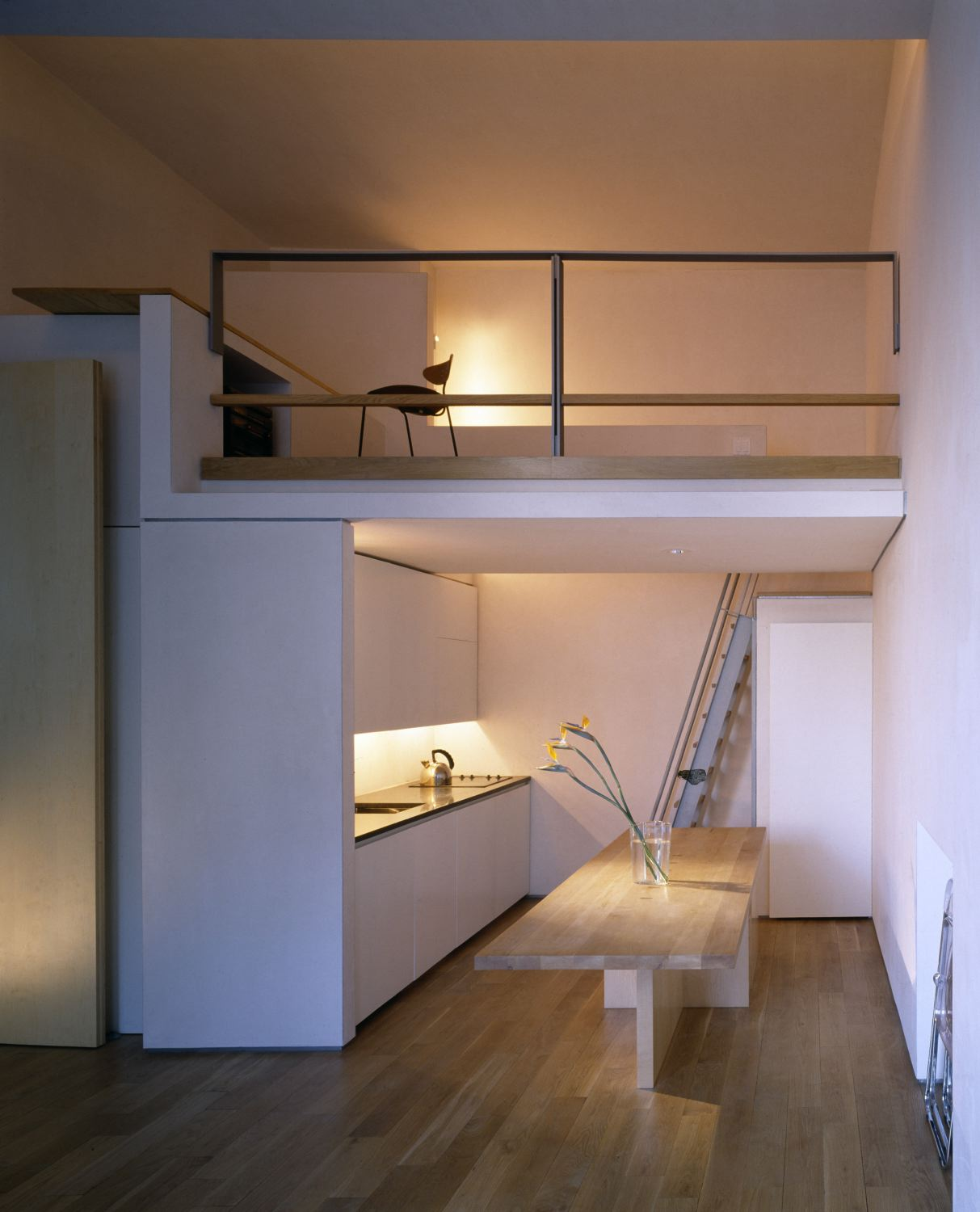
Ijaz spartment, London

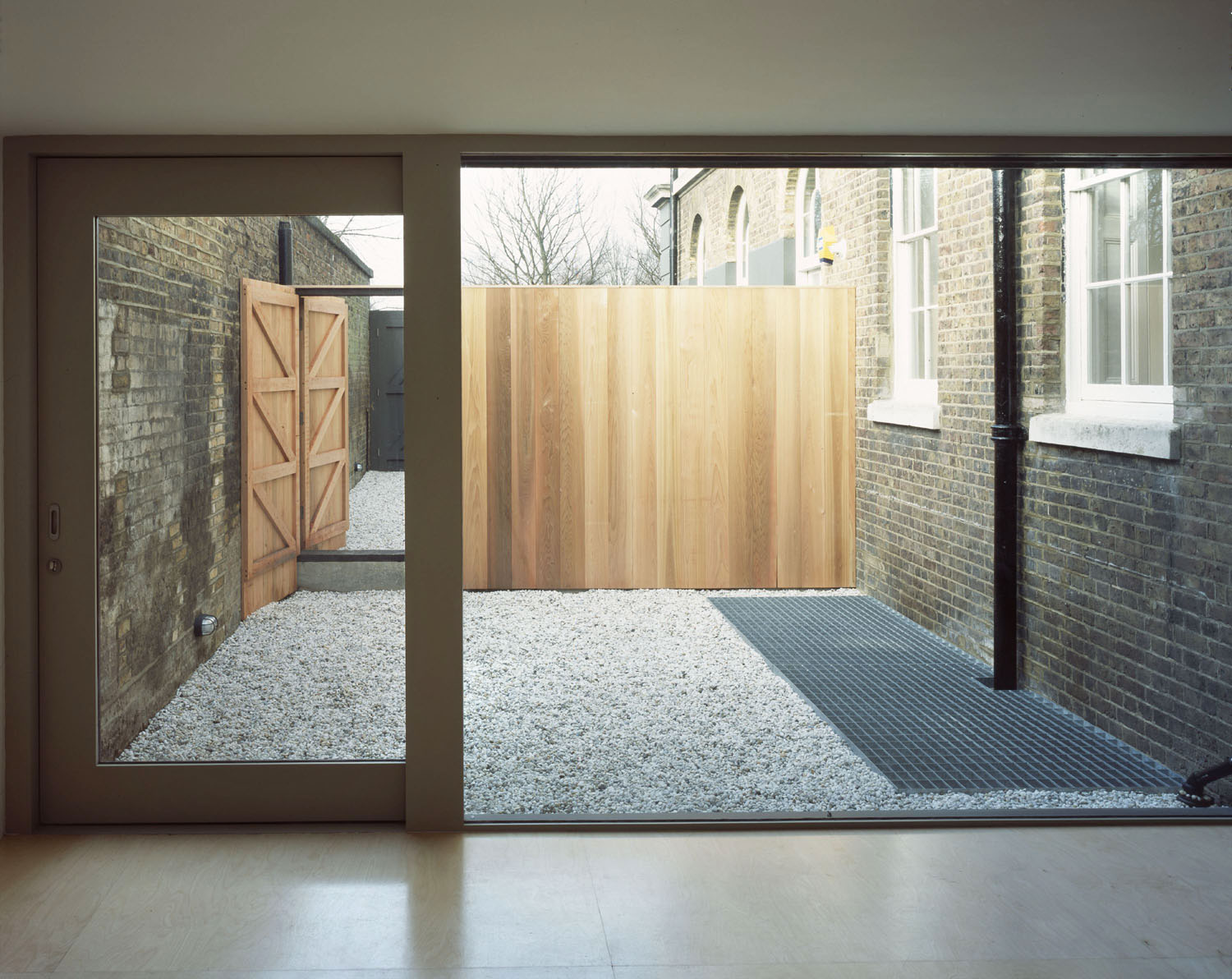
The Lion Rooms, London

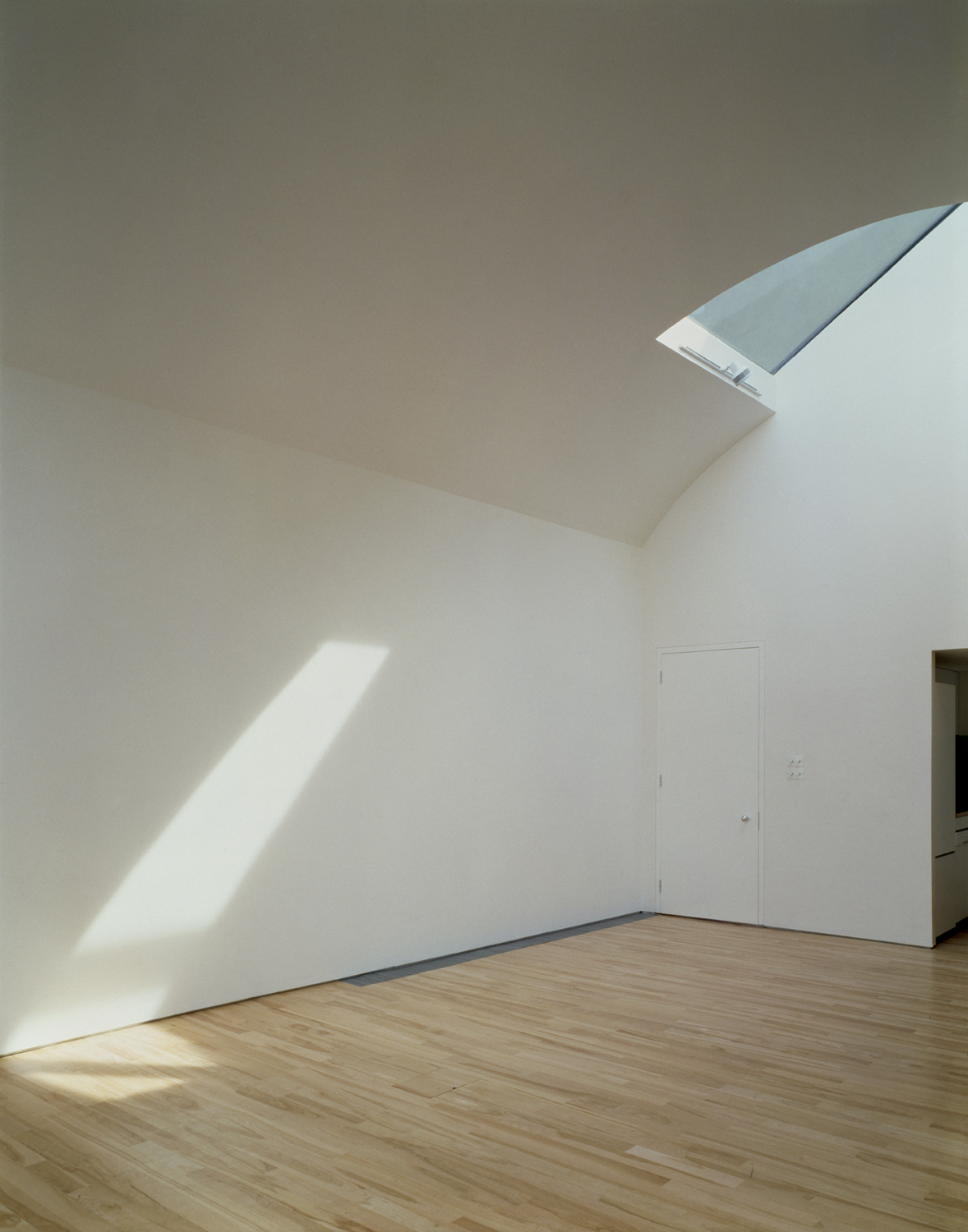
Pocket House, London

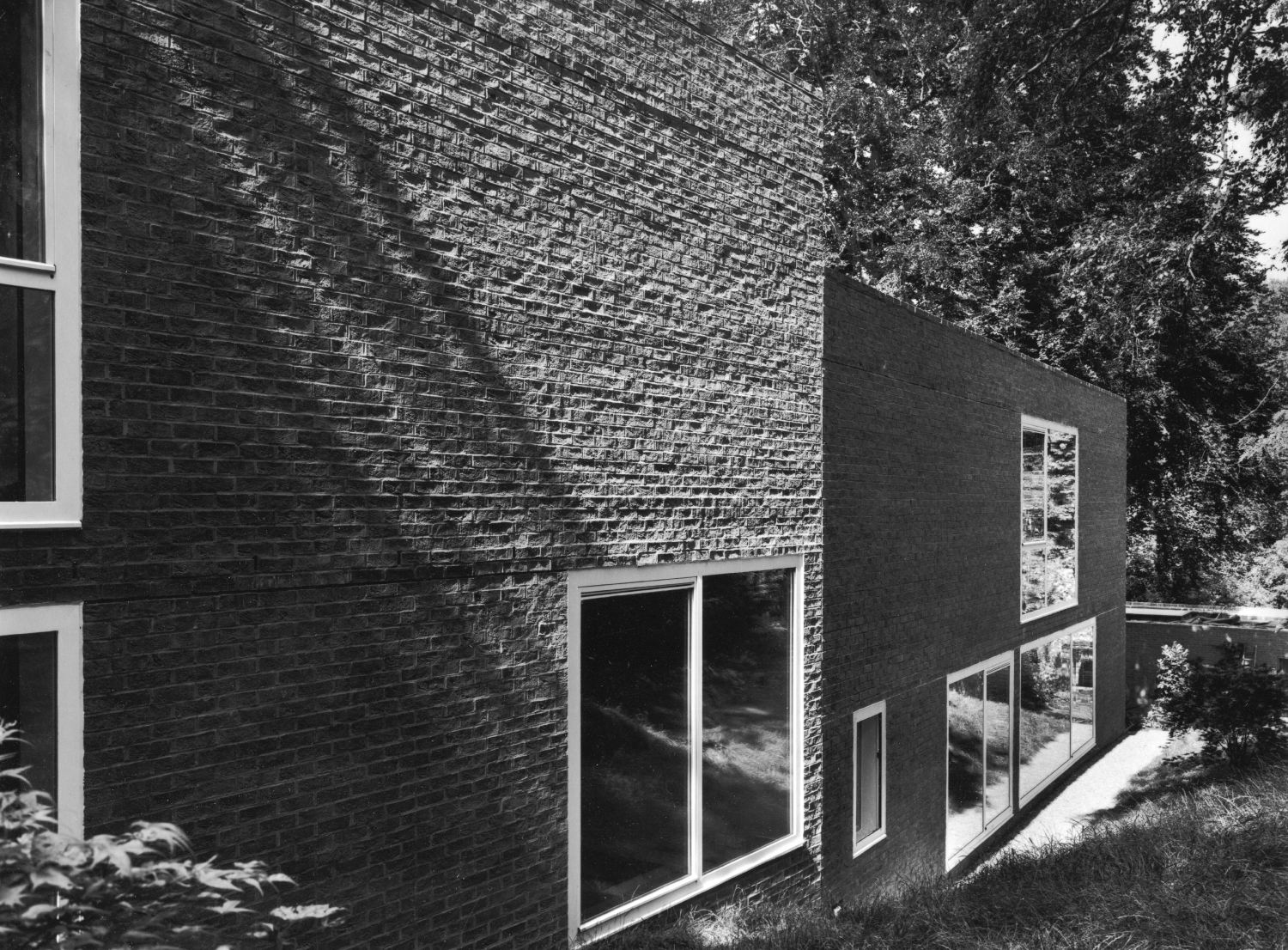
Brick Leaf House, London

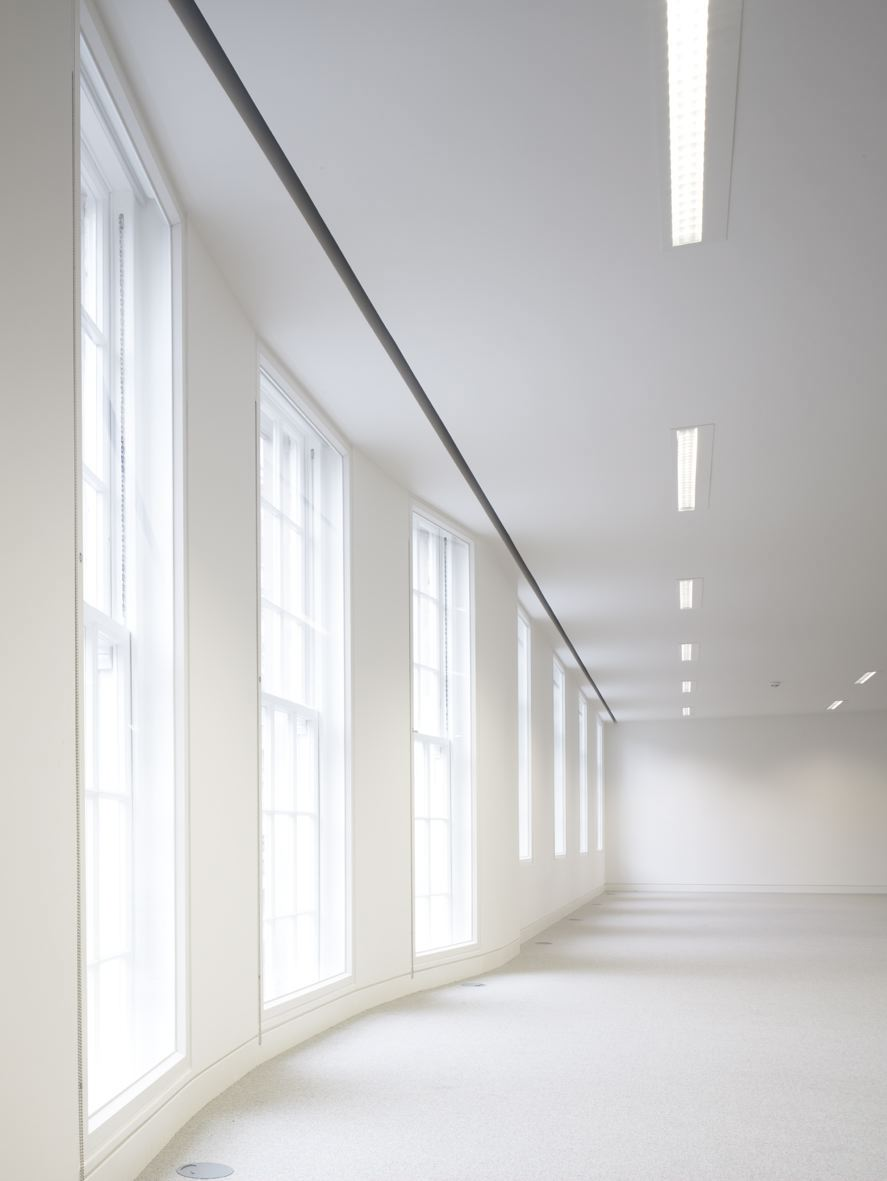
Mayfair Offices, London

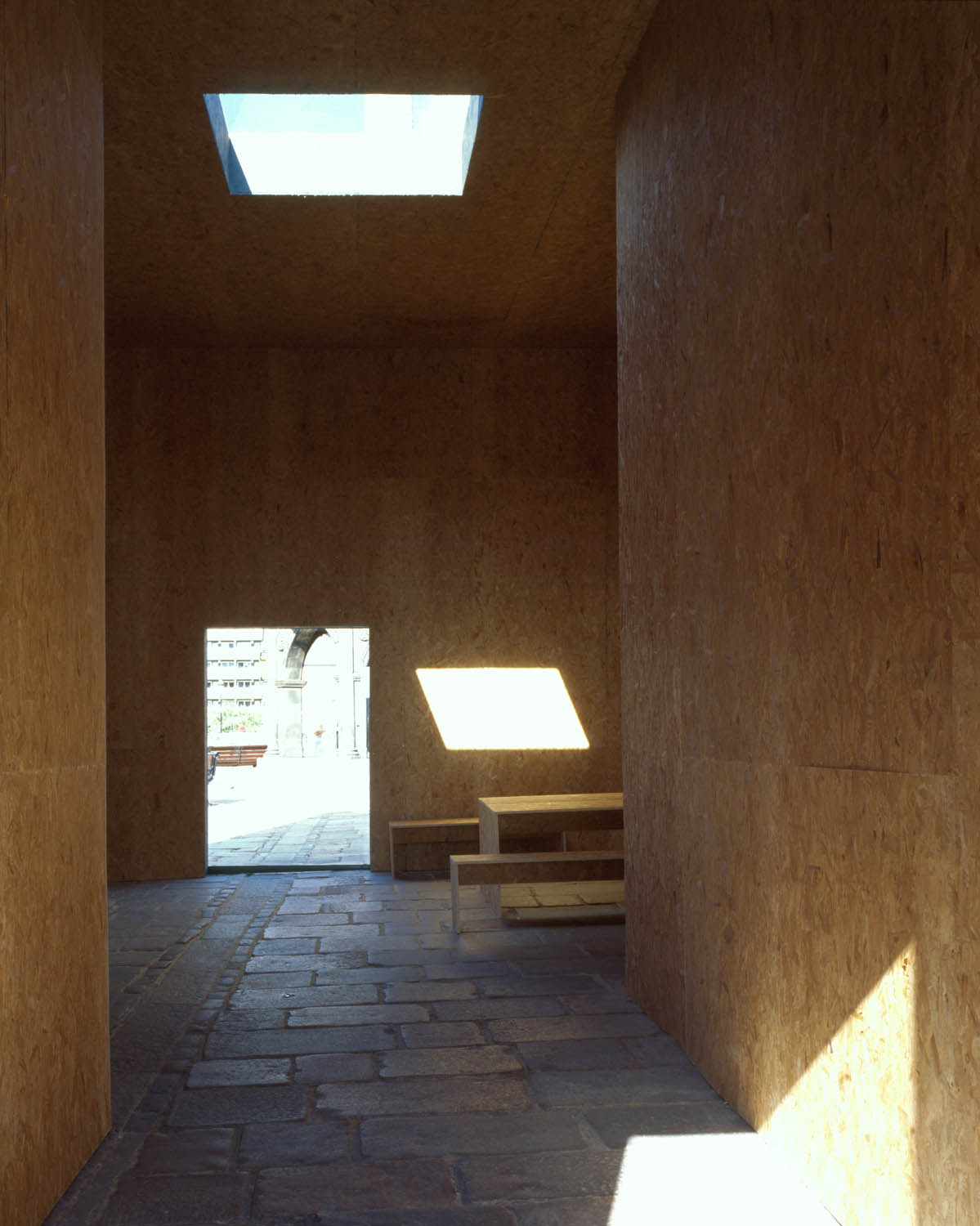
Monkey Puzzle Pavilion, Aberdeen

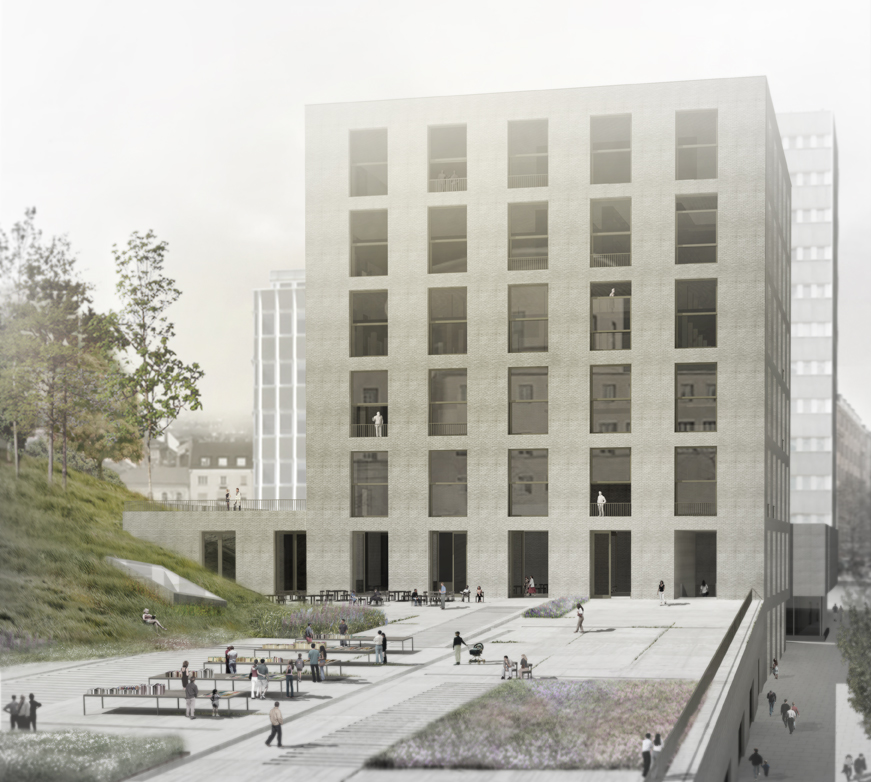
Stockholm City Library competition, Stockholm

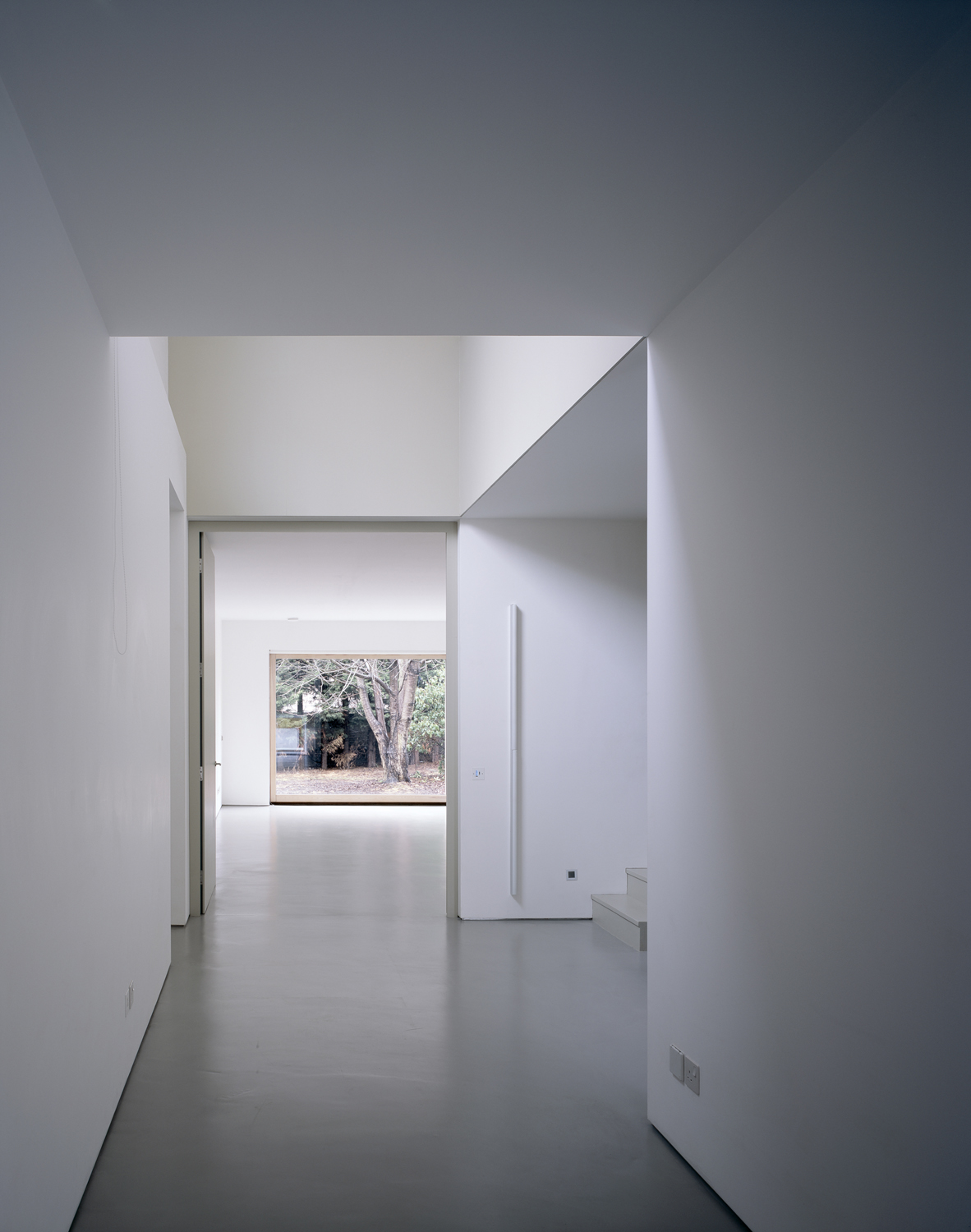
Painted House, London

== Monographs ==
- De Aedibus International 4 , Jonathan Woolf Architects, Quart Verlag, Luzern, Switzerland, 2010; ISBN 978-3-03761-027-5, 62 pages
- Ordinary Works, Exhibition Catalogue, London, UK, 2010; ISBN 978-0-9566029-0-9, 21 pages
- Darco Magazine 12, Darco Editions, Matosinhos, Portugal, 2010; ISSN 1646-950X, 34 pages
- A New English House , Categorical Books, UK, 2005; ISBN 1-904662-04-8, 60 pages
