= Luigi Snozzi =

Swiss architect (1932–2020)

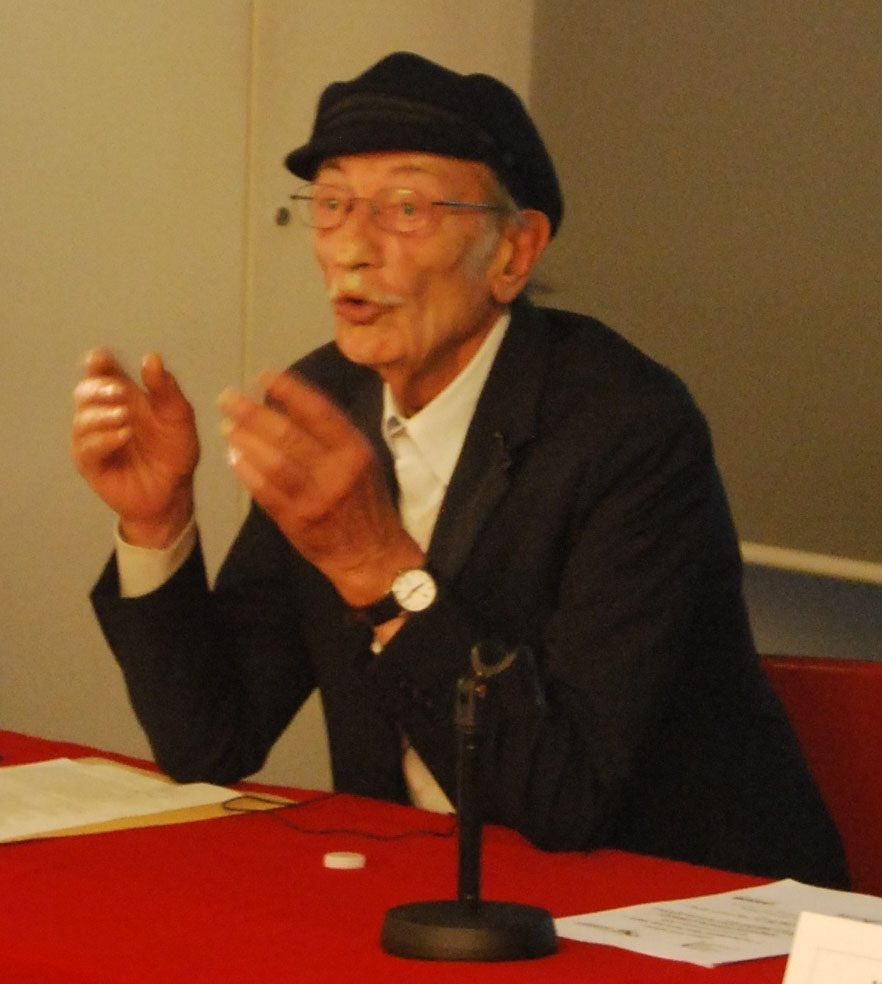
- Snozzi in 2009
- Born: 29 July 1932; Mendrisio, Ticino, Switzerland
- Died: 29 December 2020 (aged 88); Minusio, Ticino, Switzerland
- Education: ETH Zurich
- Occupations: Architect, university professor
- Spouse: Ursula Jenni

Luigi Snozzi (29 July 1932 – 29 December 2020) was a Swiss architect and university professor. He was a leading representative of the Ticino School of architecture, which achieved international prominence during the 1970s. As an educator, he taught at ETH Zurich and EPFL and became an influential figure in architectural education. His long-term redevelopment of Monte Carasso was a major urban-planning project in his career. In 1993, Harvard University awarded him its Prince of Wales Architecture Prize, and in 1996 he represented Switzerland at the Venice Biennale of Architecture.

== Biography ==
Luigi Snozzi was born on 29 July 1932 in Mendrisio. From 1952 to 1957, he studied architecture at ETH Zurich before working with the architects Peppo Brivio and Rino Tami.

In 1958, Snozzi established his own architectural office in Locarno. He married the graphic designer Ursula Jenni in 1961 and helped found the Autonomous Socialist Party in 1969. From 1962 to 1974, he was a member of Ticino’s cantonal nature conservation commission.

Snozzi had an office in Zurich from 1975 to 1988 and opened one in Lausanne in 1988. He became a member of the Academy of Arts in Berlin in 1994 and the Bavarian Academy of Fine Arts in 1996. Snozzi was also a member of the Swiss Society of Engineers and Architects. In 1996, he represented Switzerland at the Venice Biennale of Architecture.

He received the Beton Architecture Award in 1985 and again in 1993. In 1993, Harvard University awarded him its Prince of Wales Architecture Prize. ETH Zurich conferred an honorary doctorate on him in 2008. In 2018, he received the Prix Meret Oppenheim. He died of COVID-19 at the Casa Rea care home in Minusio on 29 December 2020.

== Teaching and architectural approach ==
Snozzi was a visiting lecturer in architectural design at ETH Zurich from 1973 to 1975. On taking up the post in 1973, he set down a group of short statements outlining his architectural principles, which he compiled as the Architectonic Breviary. The statements treated architectural design as inseparable from questions of human responsibility and reflected the political and ethical dimensions of his thinking.

From 1985 to 1997, Snozzi was a professor at the EPFL in Lausanne. His professorial appointment at EPFL was initially withdrawn. Students responded by demonstrating and staging a sit-in in the university president’s office, and the appointment subsequently went ahead. Snozzi returned to teach at ETH Zurich from 2003 to 2004.

Snozzi taught architectural design by using his own projects as examples. Architectural education, in his view, was a means of developing critical judgement rather than technical ability alone. He also placed the city at the centre of architectural education, arguing that students should begin by designing part of a city before turning to individual houses.

Snozzi regarded architecture as a public and social undertaking. His architectural language was rooted in post-war modernism and relied on simple materials, particularly exposed concrete. He maintained that an individual building should form part of its wider urban context and take account of its inhabitants.

In his 1985 inaugural lecture at EPFL, Snozzi used the term projets alternatifs for unrealised designs that challenged the way places were being developed. He later used his unrealised 1973 housing proposal for Celerina in teaching to help students examine planning decisions and their effects on the built environment.

Snozzi was a prominent figure in the movement against indiscriminate development in Ticino. He designed social housing, believing that good architecture should be accessible to people with limited means.

In 2010, EPFL presented Luigi Snozzi – Prof. d’Architecture, bringing together his work with projects by fifty former students to show his influence as a teacher.

== Architecture ==
=== Projects ===
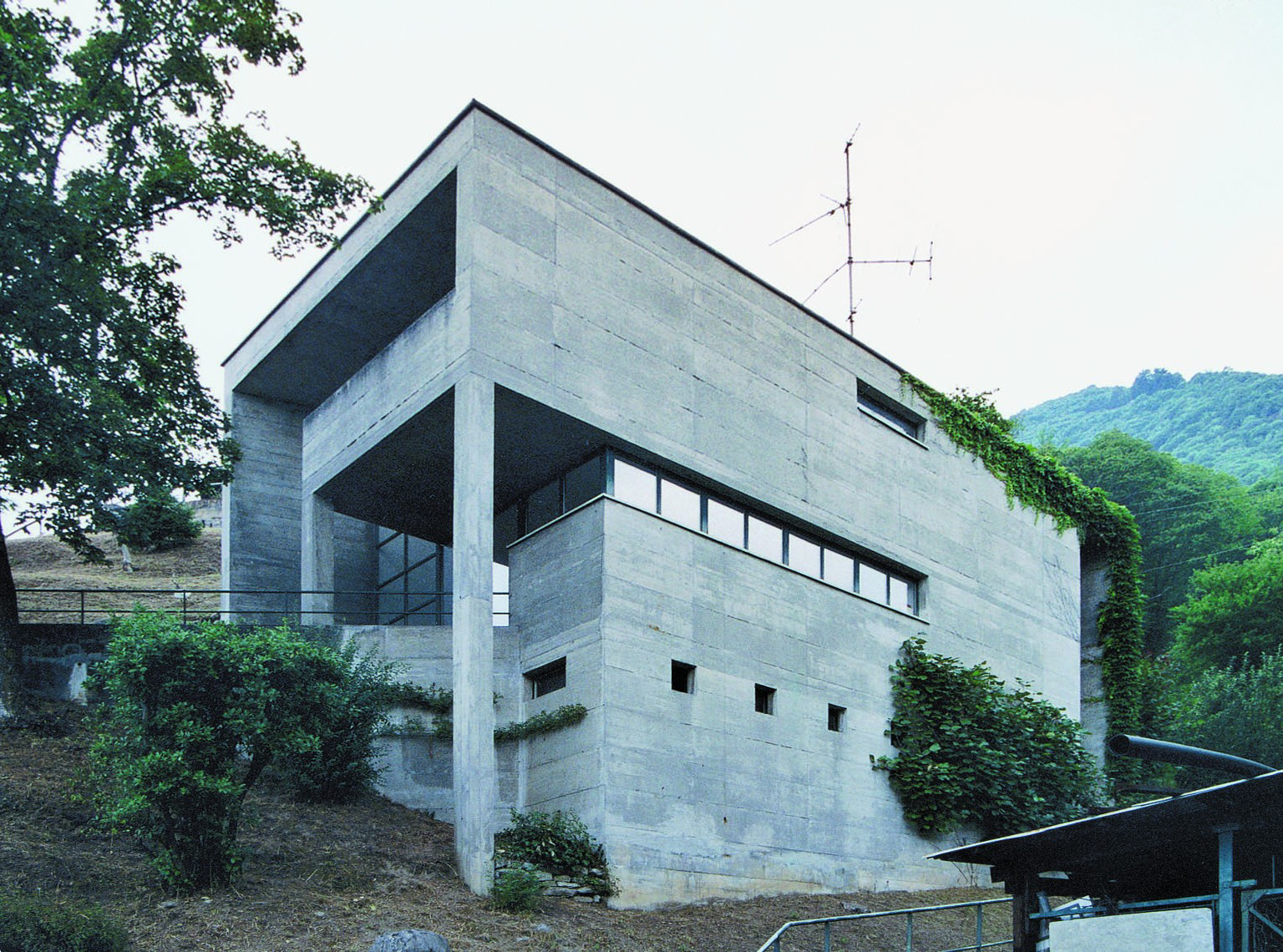
Casa Kalman, Brione sopra Minusio (1974–1976)

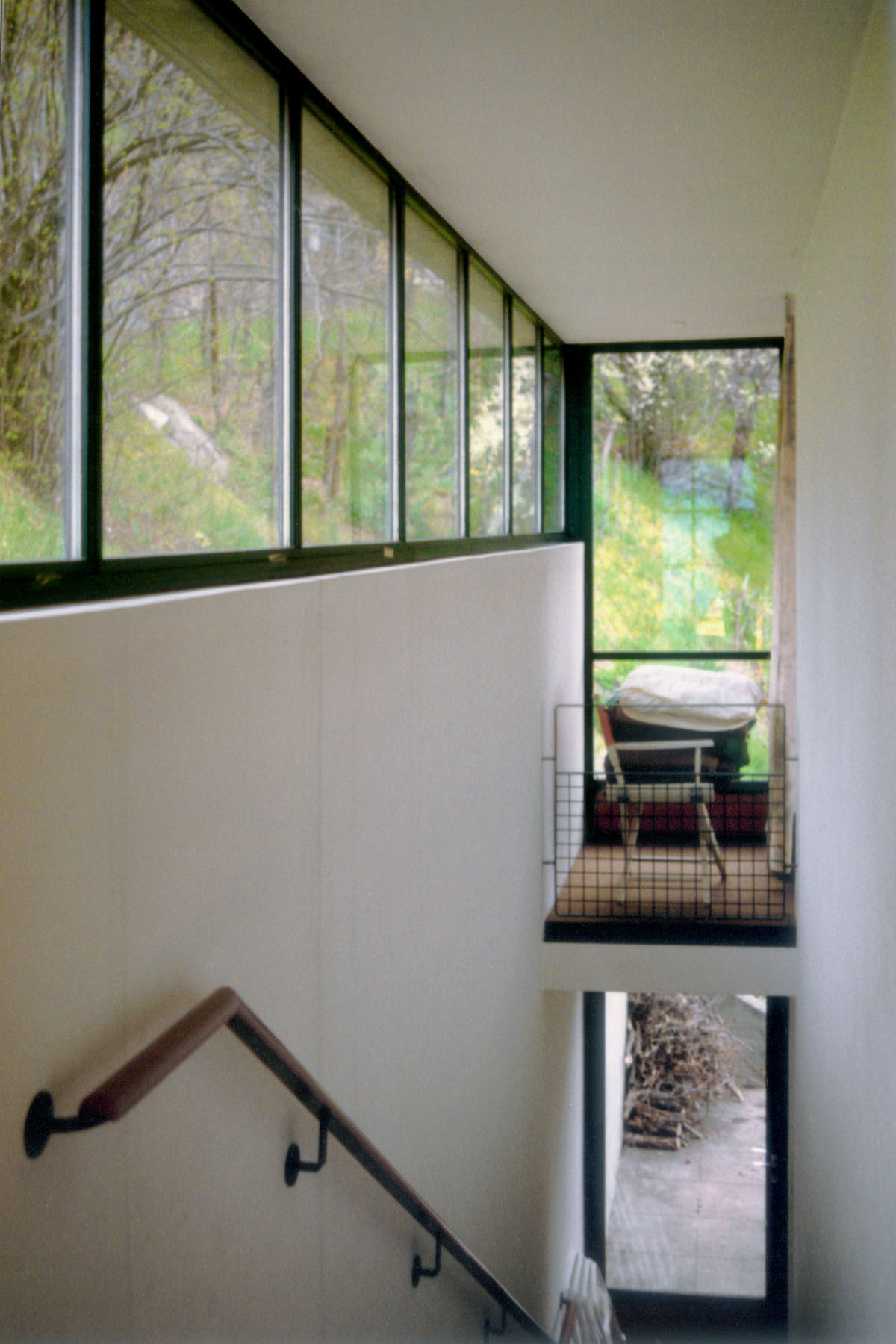
Staircase in Casa Kalman

From 1962 to 1968, Snozzi shared an architectural practice with Livio Vacchini. Their projects included the Fabrizia office building in Bellinzona, completed in 1965. For a 1970 competition concerning the EPFL campus at Dorigny, Snozzi worked with Mario Botta, Aurelio Galfetti, Flora Ruchat and Tita Carloni. Among his public projects was the school and town hall in San Nazzaro (1973–1978). His later residential projects included Casa Kalman in Brione sopra Minusio (1974–1976), the Barbarossa House in Minusio (1985) and Casa Bernasconi in Carona (1988–1989).

In his residential projects, Snozzi adapted the geometry of modern architecture to the topography and character of each site rather than repeating a fixed building type. At Casa Kalman, he paired a curved terrace wall that followed the hillside and a straight front wall that cut across it, creating a contrast between the building and the landscape. A pergola framed views across Lake Maggiore. His work drew on both modernism and Italian Rationalism. Snozzi's later projects included the STOA residential complex in Maastricht (1993–2002) and Stadthof in Sursee (2003), a large mixed-use building conceived as a link between the town’s historic centre and newer development.

=== Monte Carasso ===
Snozzi produced a master plan for Monte Carasso in 1977. The redevelopment became his principal long-term project, and brought him international attention. With a series of architectural interventions, he sought to restore urban life to the fragmented settlement of Monte Carasso.

As part of the redevelopment, Snozzi converted the former Augustinian convent into a primary school and community centre (1987–1993). He combined modern additions with the existing historic fabric. The convent became a focal point for the wider redevelopment of the village, with new houses and other buildings introduced around it. His planning and buildings contributed substantially to Monte Carasso receiving the Wakker Prize in 1993. His work there continued into the twenty-first century, including a further extension to the school complex in 2009.

== Selected works ==
- Fabrizia office building, Bellinzona (1965), with Livio Vacchini
- Casa Snider, Verscio (1966), with Livio Vacchini
- School and town hall, San Nazzaro (1973–1978)
- Casa Kalman, Brione sopra Minusio (1974–1976)
- Barbarossa House, Minusio (1985)
- Casa Walser, Loco (1985–1987)
- Former Augustinian convent conversion, Monte Carasso (1987–1993)
- Casa Bernasconi, Carona (1988–1989)
- Parish centre, Lenzburg (1992–1994), with Bruno Jenni
- STOA residential complex, Maastricht (1993–2002)
- Stadthof, Sursee (2003)

== Legacy ==
Snozzi was an influential theorist and leading figure of the Ticino School of architecture. The architectural scene in Ticino rose to international prominence during the 1970s. The architects associated with the Ticino School combined regional traditions with modernism and a strong relationship to the landscape. In 1975, architectural theorist Martin Steinmann curated the ETH Zurich exhibition Tendenzen – Neuere Architektur im Tessin. Kenneth Frampton subsequently applied the term "Ticino School" to this group of architects. The exhibition helped bring Snozzi and other Ticino architects to international attention, although the architects associated with the movement did not share a single stylistic approach.

Through his designs and teaching, Snozzi shaped a younger generation of Swiss architects, despite completing a relatively small number of buildings. His modernist architecture reflected his belief that buildings should serve both society and the wider urban environment. The first exhibition of his work in Germany was held in Hamburg in 1997.

== Gallery ==
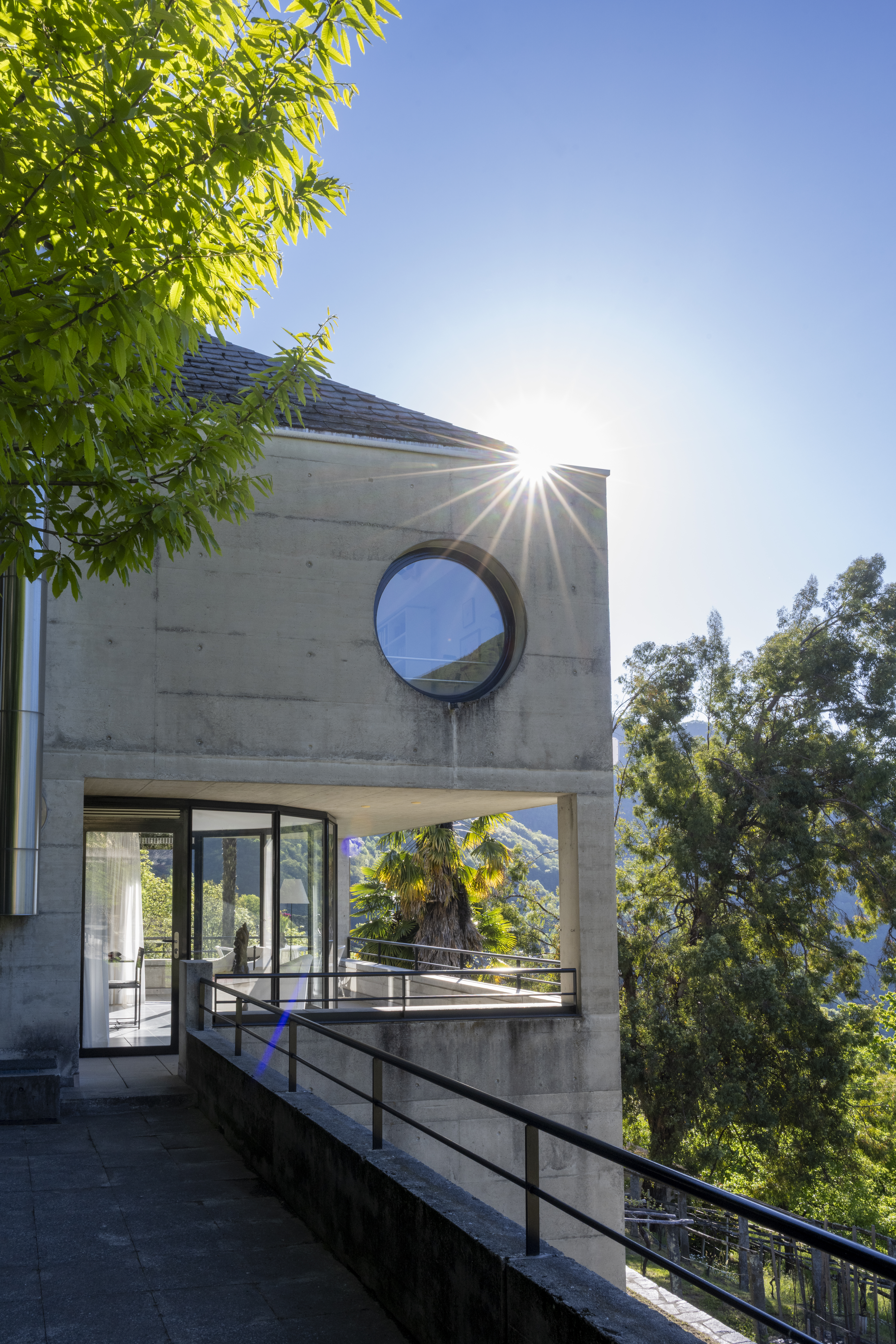
Casa Walser, Loco (1985–1987)

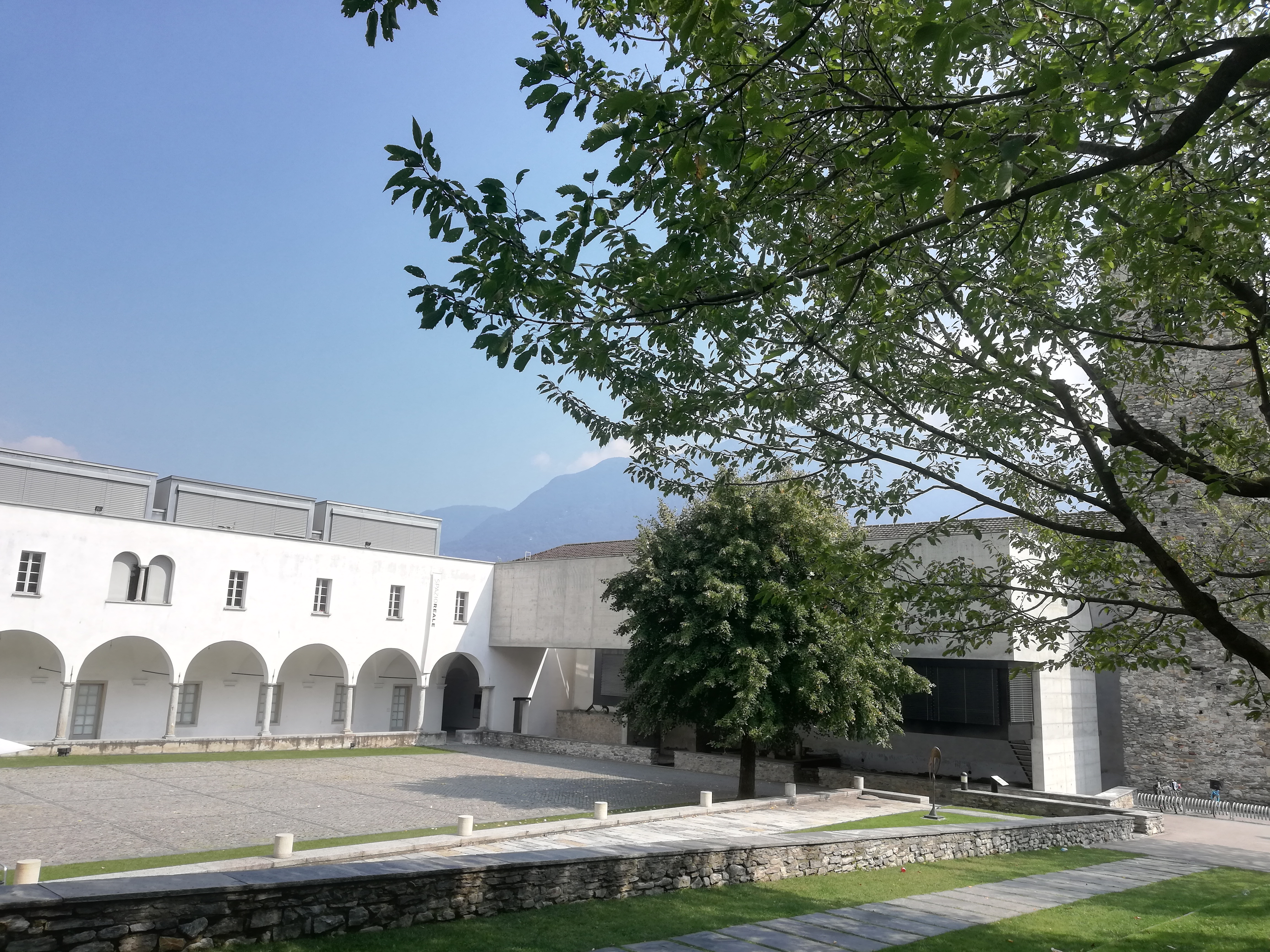
Former Augustinian convent, Monte Carasso (1987–1993)

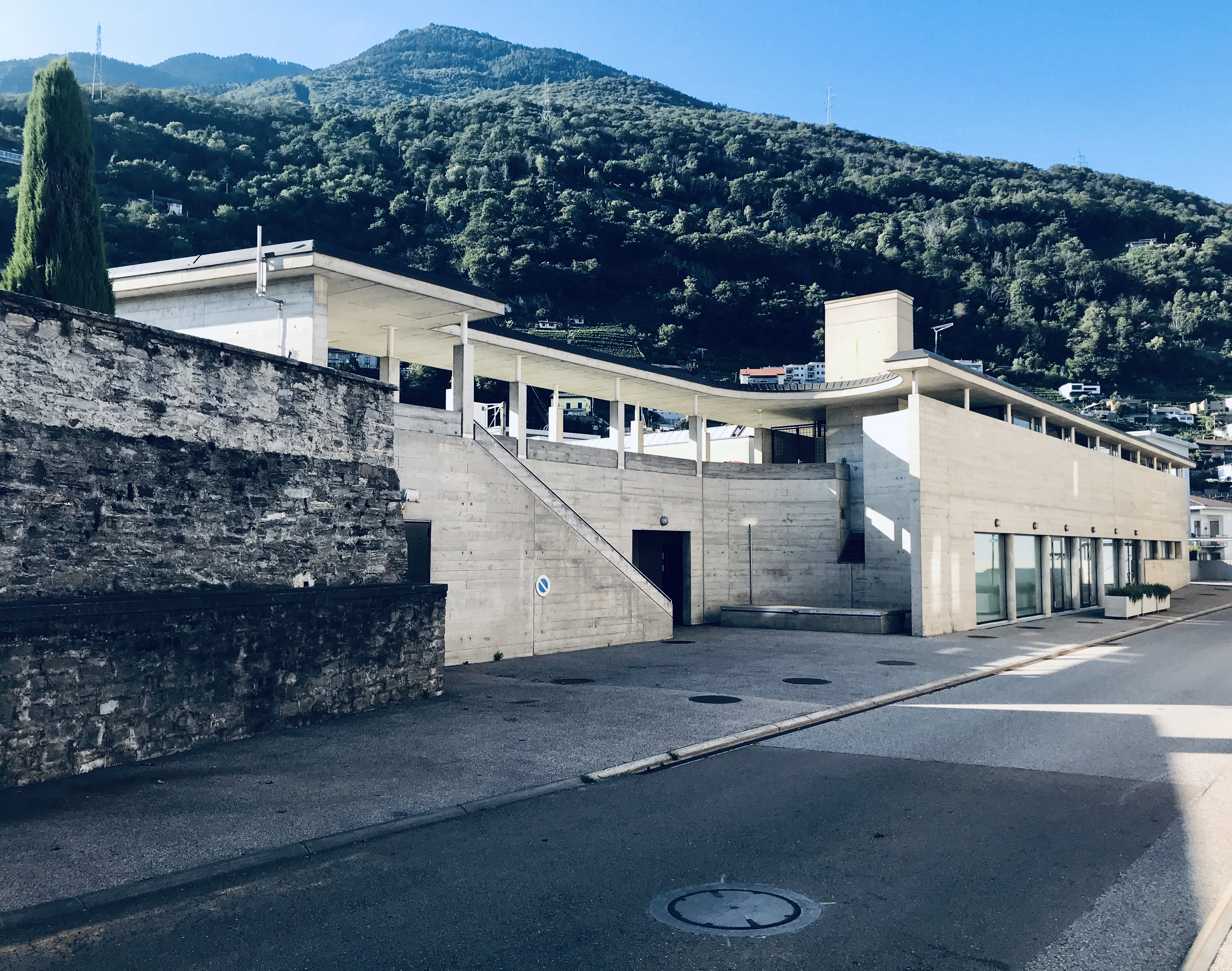
Sports hall and changing facilities, Monte Carasso

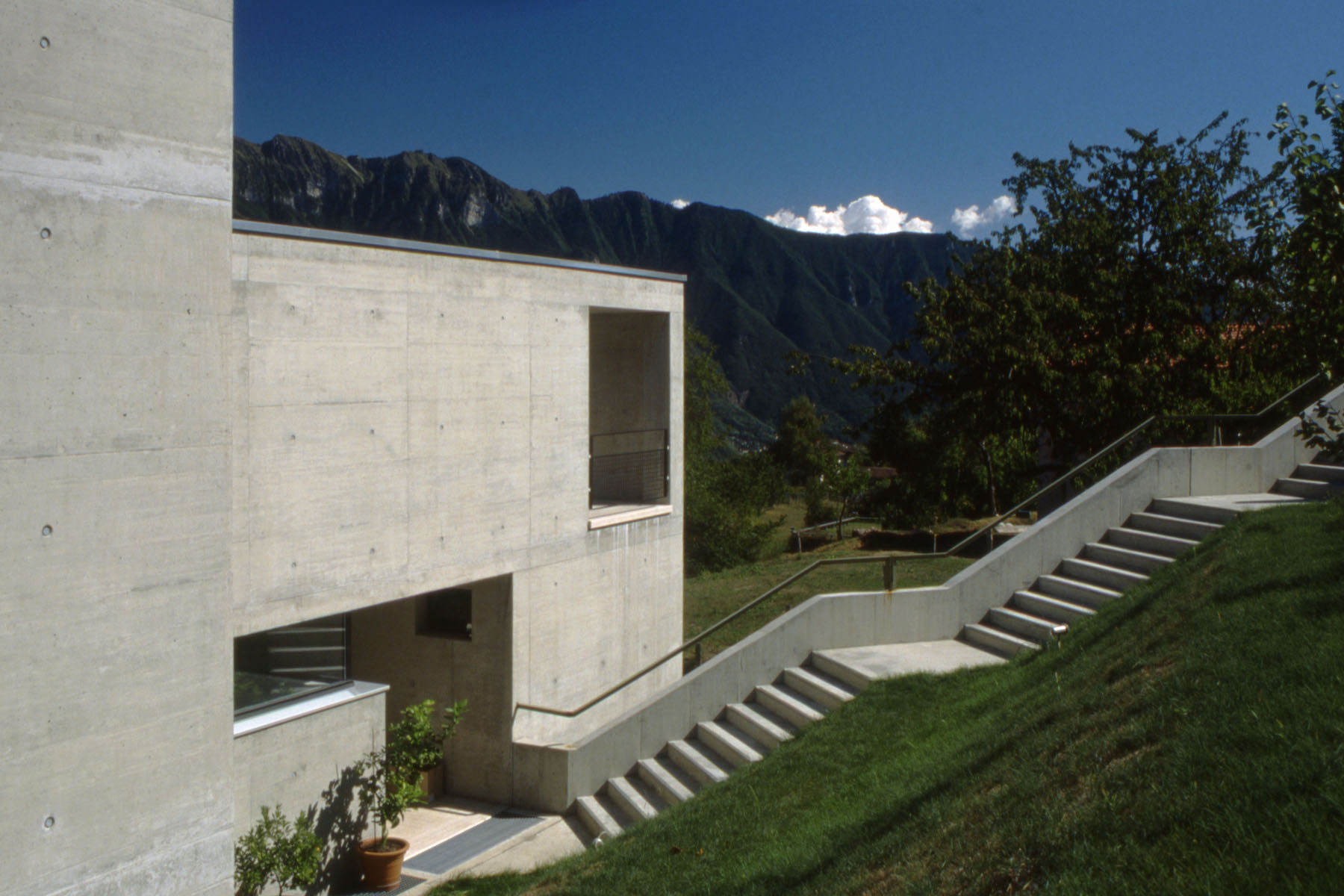
Casa Bernasconi, Carona (1988–1989)

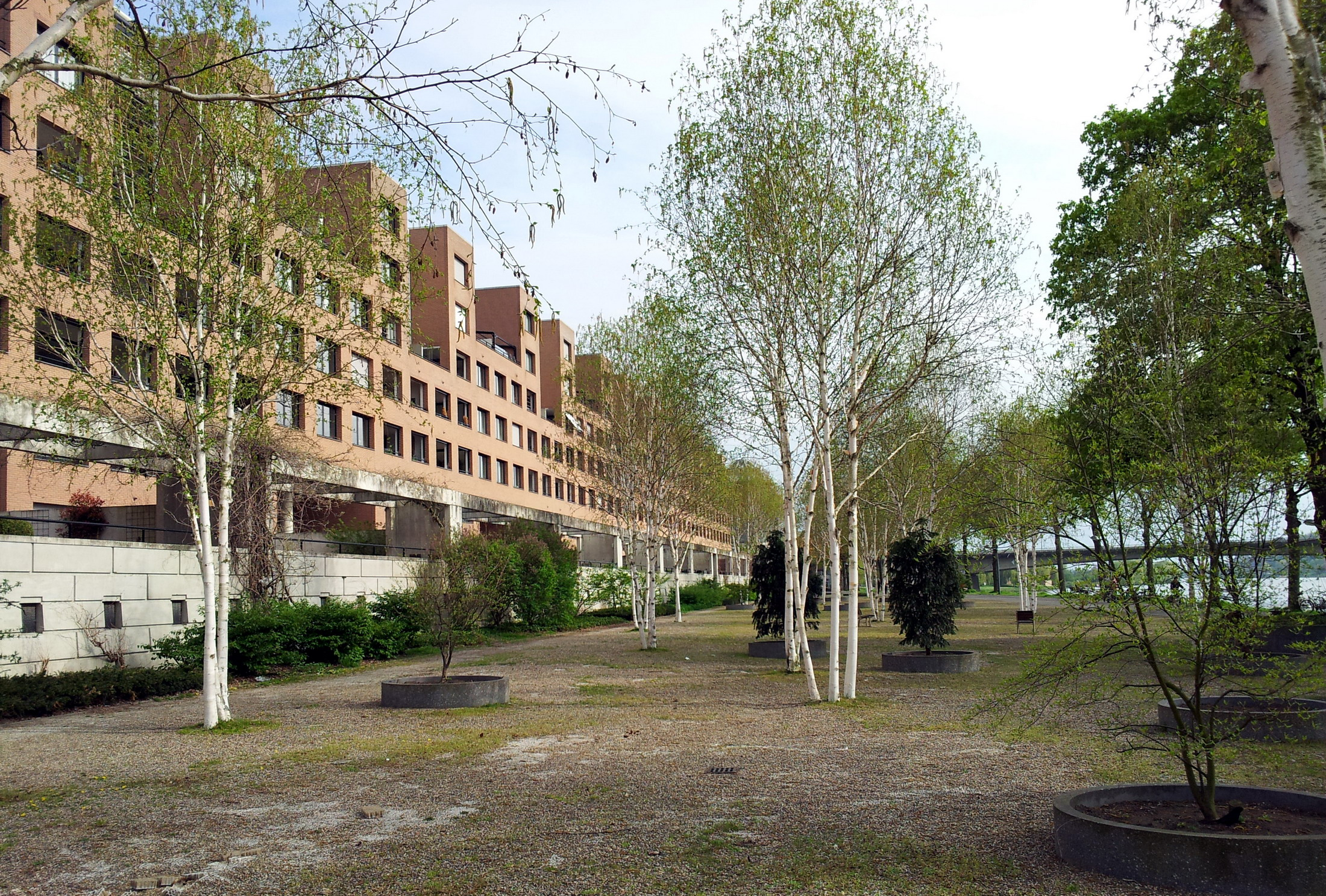
Stoa residential complex, Maastricht (1993–2002)

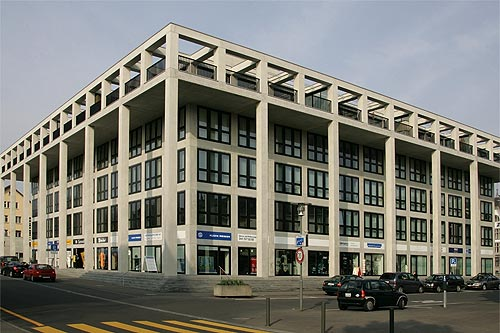
Stadthof, Sursee (2003)
