= Livio Vacchini =

Swiss architect (1933–2007)

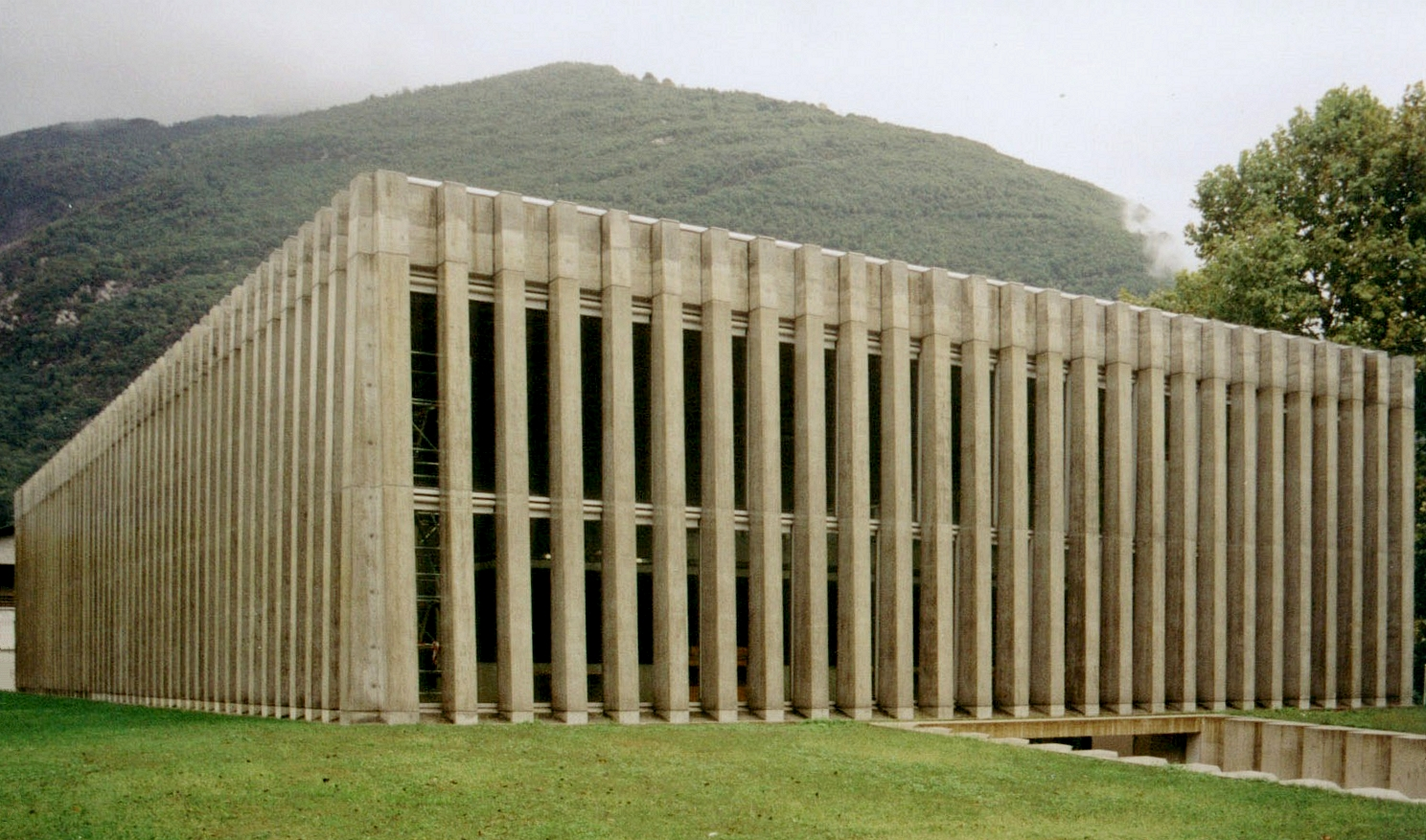
Palestra Caserma, Losone

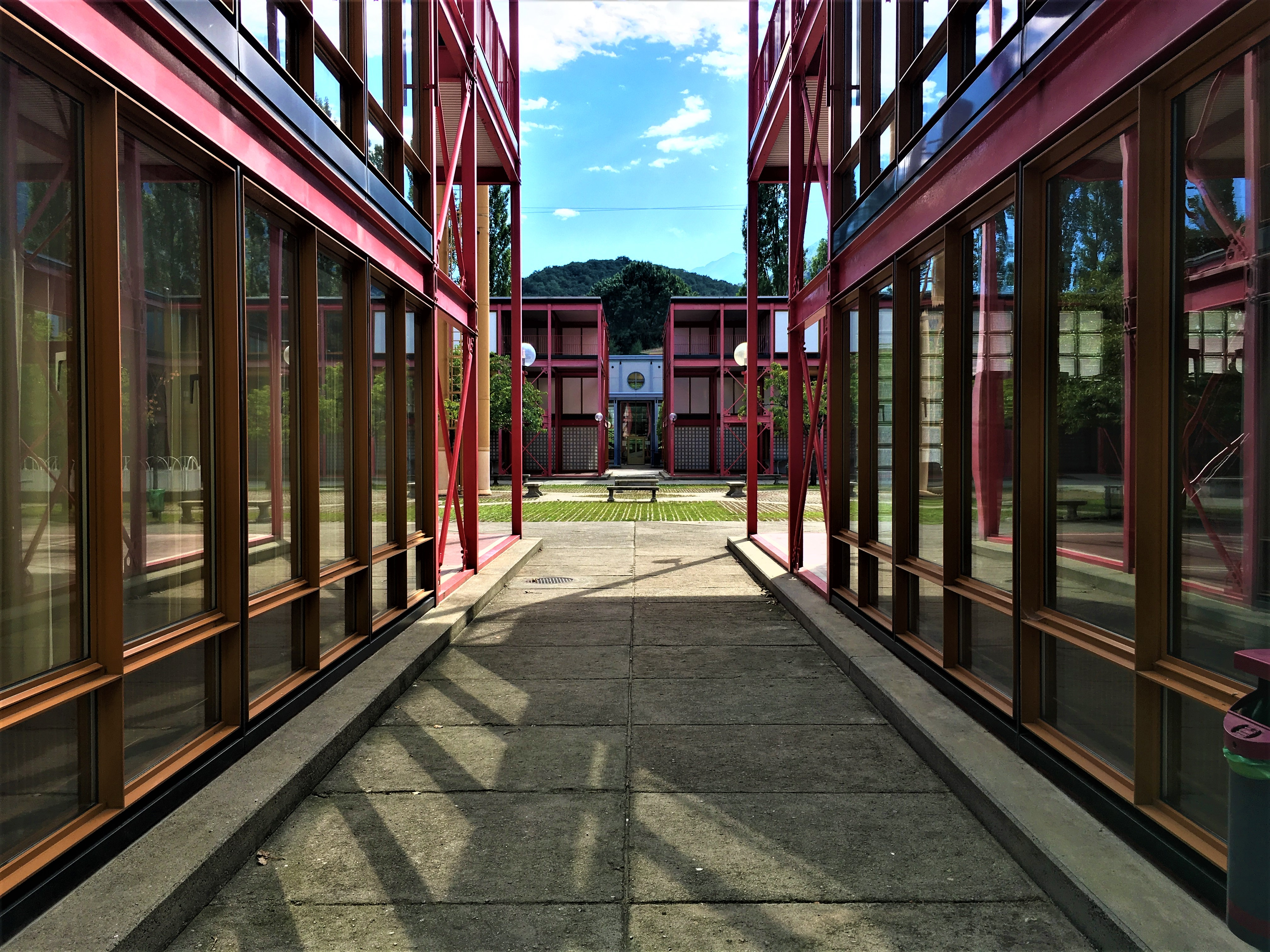
Losone Secondary School

Livio Vacchini (February 27, 1933 – April 2, 2007) was a Swiss architect from Ticino.

== Life ==
Livio Vacchini was born in Locarno. From 1953 to 1958 he studied architecture at Swiss Federal Institute of Technology in Zurich. After a stay in Stockholm and Paris from 1959 to 1961, he established his own architecture studio in Locarno called Studio Vacchini architetti, working closely with Luigi Snozzi and Silvia Gmür.

== Architecture ==
The works of Livio Vacchini feature an extreme coherence of theme and practice. Each project is conceived ideally as the continuation of the lines of research explored by modern architects of the classical tradition such as Auguste Perret, Ludwig Mies van der Rohe, and Louis Kahn. An extreme reduction of structural elements is present in all his designs. The most important values of his works lie precisely in their intentional "untimeliness": indifferent to novelty, interested only in respecting an inner coherence, detached, far from the chatter and gossip of the world of the architecture of our time.

Livio Vacchini designed houses, office buildings, schools, and community facilities in Switzerland and France. His major works are the school of Montagnola near Locarno, his own house in Costa (Switzerland), and the school of architecture of Nancy (France).
