= Raphael Zuber =

Swiss architect (born 1973)

Raphael Zuber (born 5 June 1973 in Chur) is a Swiss architect.

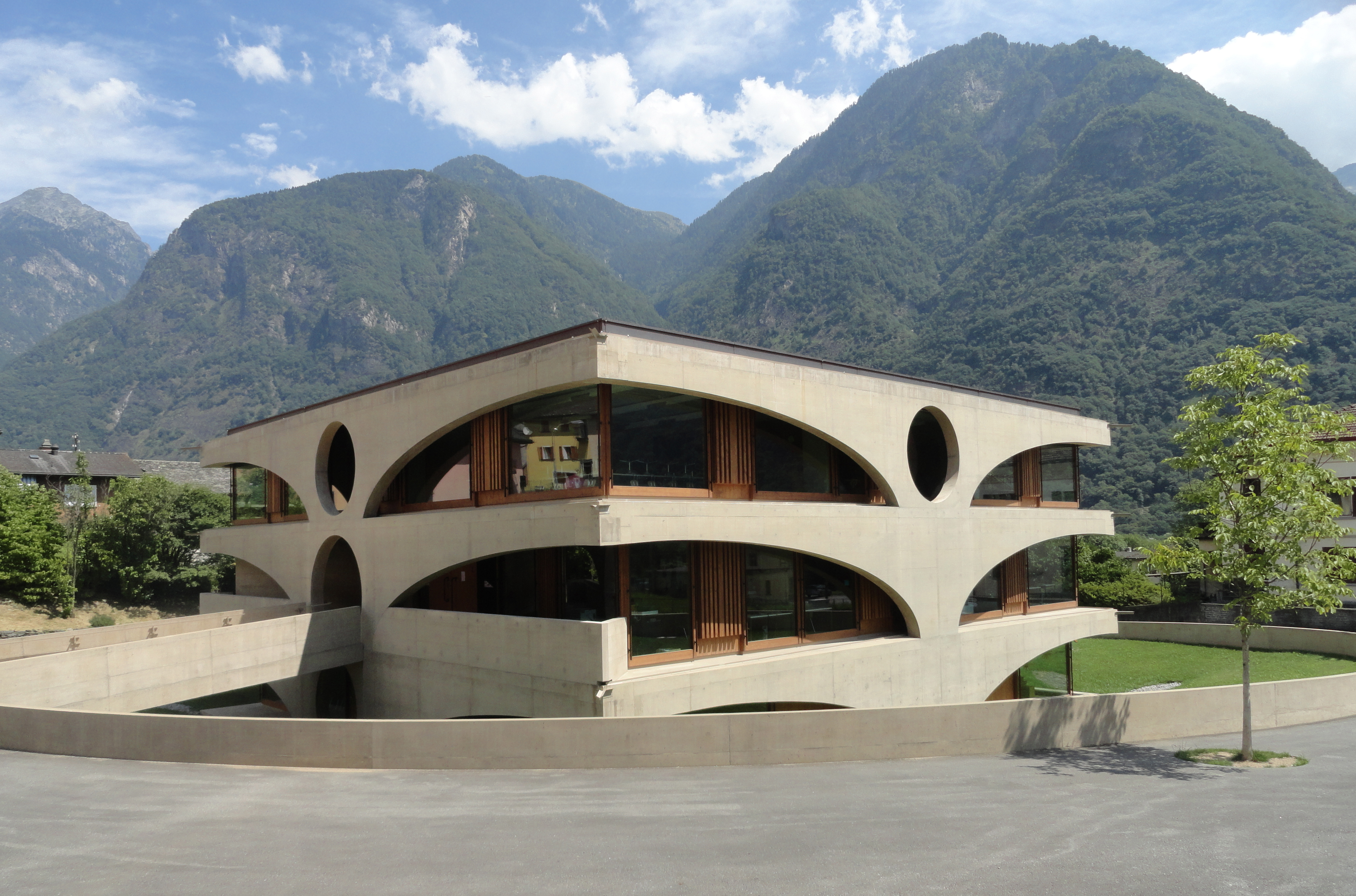
Schoolhouse, Grono

== Biography ==
Raphael Zuber studied at ETH Zurich until 2001 and practiced with Valerio Olgiati in Zurich. After graduating, he founded an architectural office in Chur. Zuber taught at the Accademia di Architettura di Mendrisio, the Oslo School of Architecture and Design, the EPF Lausanne, the ETH Zurich and at the Cornell University Ithaca. Raphael Zuber was invited by Alejandro Aravena to the Venice Biennale of Architecture in 2016, where he showed four of his most recent projects.

== Works ==
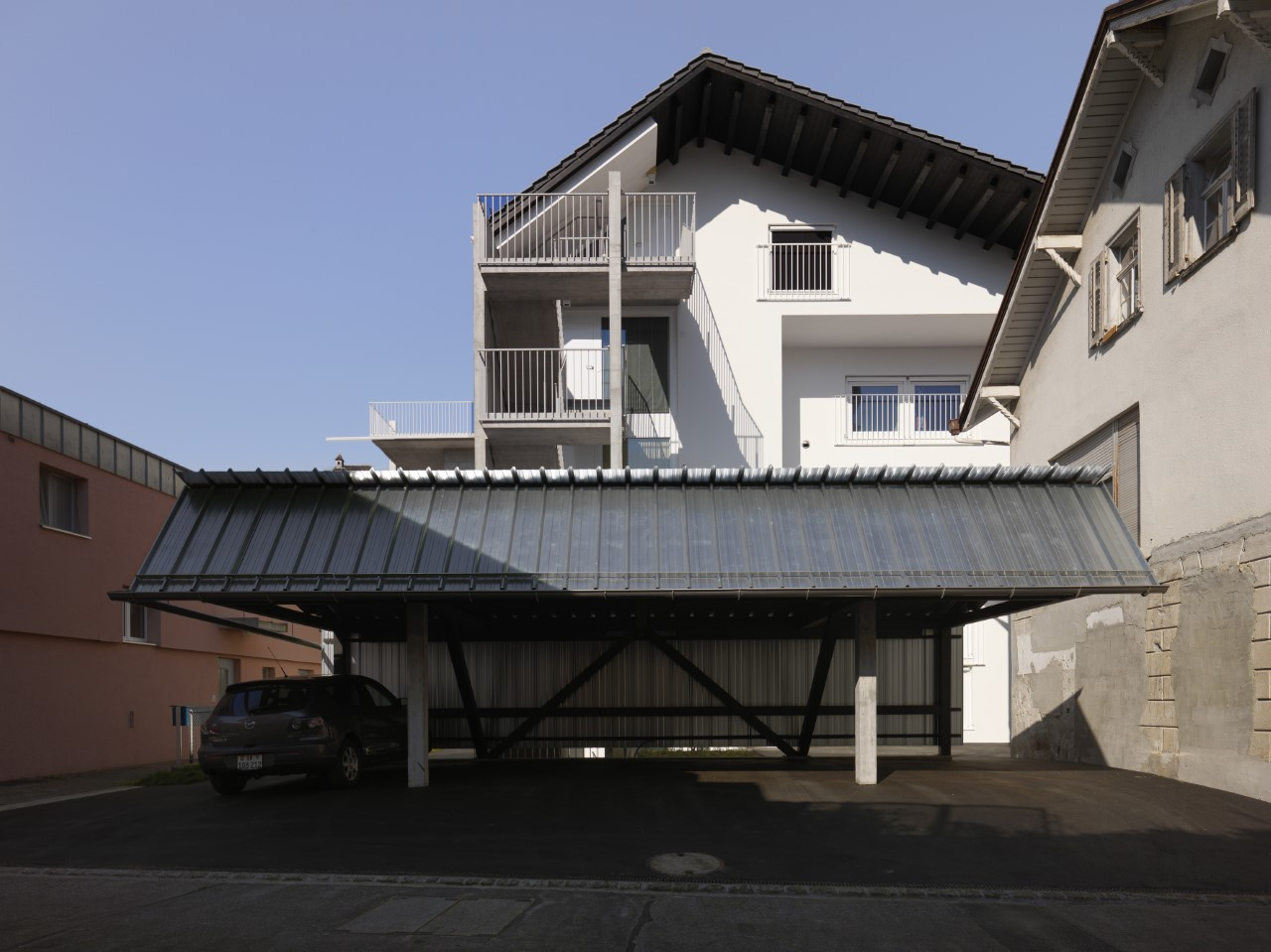
Apartment building, Domat/Ems

- 2007–2011: Schoolhouse, Grono with Conzett Bronzini Gartmann and Maurus Schifferli
- 2005–2016: Apartment building, Domat/Ems with Conzett Bronzini Gartmann
- 2015–2016: Inverted house, Hokkaido with the Oslo School of Architecture and Design and Kengo Kuma and Associates
- 2018–2024: House at the Black Sea with Laura Cristea
- 2018–2026: Public swimming pool, Gossau with Ferrari Gartmann and Maurus Schifferli

== Awards ==
- 2012: Architecture and engineering prize for earthquake-proof construction for schoolhouse Grono
- 2013: Auszeichnungen für gute Bauten Graubünden for schoolhouse Grono
- 2018: Recognition award from the city of Chur

== Literature ==
- Important Buildings. Istituto Svizzero di Roma, Kaleidoscope Press, Milano 2010 ISBN 978-88-97185-01-7
- Important Buildings. A personal choice made by students with Raphael Zuber. Accademia di Architettura di Mendrisio, Juni 2011 ISBN 978-3-033-02464-9
- Raphael Zuber – Four Projects. Pelinu Books, Bukarest 2020 ISBN 978-973-0-29819-2
