= Chief Government Architect of the Netherlands =

The Chief Government Architect (Dutch: Rijksbouwmeester) is the senior architect for the Dutch Ministry of Housing, Spatial Planning and the Environment (VROM). The Chief Architect's responsibility is to protect and stimulate the architectural quality and urban suitability of government buildings in the Netherlands. The position was previously known as Chief National Architect (landsbouwmeester) and Royal Chief Architect (rijksarchitect).

The Chief Architect provides an architect's view in urban planning projects and national, architectural policy. The architect is authorized to advise the government on relevant issues, either at the request of the government or of his own accord. The idea is also that he will pay special attention and act as a sort of guardian for monuments and other buildings of value as cultural heritage, as well as the use of visual art in government buildings.

The Chief Architect is officially the chief advisor to the Director-General of the Rijksgebouwendienst, the agency within VROM that manages government buildings. He is also the chief advisor for architectural policy to the ministers of VROM, of Housing, Neighborhoods and Integration and other ministers with responsibilities in this policy area. He is the head of his own staff bureau, the Chief Architect's Studio (Dutch: Atelier Rijksbouwmeester), which assists him in his duties. Starting in 2005 the Studio also houses three other policy advisors with similar tasks: the Government Advisor on Landscape, the Government Advisor on Infrastructure and the Government Advisor on Cultural Heritage. The four together are the College of Government Advisors.

The Chief Architect has great influence on urban building projects, as he decides which architects are allowed to bid on projects of the Rijksgebouwendienst.

The position of Chief Government Architect of the Netherlands has existed, under one name or another, since 1806. In that year Jean-Thomas Thibault was first named Royal Architect. The position was not unique between 1870 and 1920 as several Master Builders held the title simultaneously, each working for a different government service doing some sort of construction. After the formation of the Rijksgebouwendienst in 1924, only one Chief Architect position remained and he was in charge of the actual design work for government building. This changed to the current advisory position in the period 1958-1971, when Jo Vegter was Chief Architect. Following the new definition of the office (which was more neutral), the requests for the Chief Architect's involvement increased. During the 1980s his responsibilities were increased as well and finally it became necessary to create the other three Government Advisorships, to deal with the glut of work.

In 1998 a similar position was created in Flanders, the Flemish Government Architect.

== Master Builders ==
- Jean-Thomas Thibault (1806–1810; Royal Architect)
- Bartold Ziesenis (1813–1820; Royal Architect/Imperial Architect/Architect of national buildings)
- Isaäc Warnsinck (1845–1857; architect-advisor for prisons)
- Allard C. Pierson (1857–1870; architect-advisor for prisons)
- Willem Nicolaas Rose (1858–1867; chief architect national buildings)
- Johan Frederik Metzelaar (1870–1886; engineer-architect of prisons and courthouses)
- Pierre J.H. Cuypers (1874–1921; architect of royal museum buildings)
- Lucas Hermanus Eberson (1874–1889; Royal Architect)
- Jacobus van Lokhorst (1878–1906; government building engineer for education etc.)
- Adolph J.M. Mulder (1878–1918; Chief Architect of monuments)
- Willem Cornelis Metzelaar (1883–1914; engineer-architect of prisons and courthouses)
- Cornelis H. Peters (1884–1915; national buildings, first district)
- M.A. van Wadenoyen (1886–1907; government building engineer for education etc.)
- Johannes A.W. Vrijman (1888–1923; government building engineer for education etc.)
- Gustav C. (Cees) Bremer (1924–1945)
- Hayo Hoekstra (1945–1946)
- Gijsbert Friedhoff (1946–1958)
- Jo Vegter (1958–1971)
- Frank Sevenhuijsen (1971–1974; ad interim)
- Wim Quist (1974–1979)
- Tjeerd Dijkstra (1979–1986)
- Frans van Gool (1986–1988)
- Jan Dirk Peereboom Voller (1988–1989; ad interim)
- Kees Rijnboutt (1989–1995)
- Wytze Patijn (1995–2000)
- Jo Coenen (November 2000 - September 2004)
- Mels Crouwel (October 2004 - August 2008)
- Liesbeth van der Pol (August 2008 - June 2011)
- Frits van Dongen (August 2011 - August 2015)
- Floris Alkemade (September 2015 - 1 September 2021)
- Francesco Veenstra (1 September 2021 -)
