= El Croquis =

Spanish architecture magazine

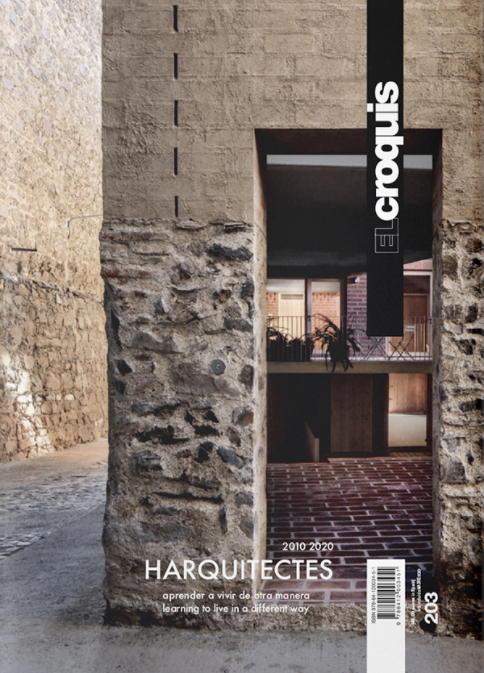
- El Croquis
- Editor: Fernando Márquez and Richard Levene
- Frequency: 6 issues a year
- Circulation: Europe, Asia, America, Australia
- First issue: 1982
- Company: El Croquis Editorial
- Country: Spain
- Based in: Madrid
- Language: Spanish and English
- Website: www.elcroquis.es
- ISSN: 0212-5633

El Croquis (Spanish; translates to English as "The Sketch") is one of the most prestigious architectural magazines in the world.

The leading international architects choose it as their showcase. The volumes dedicated to established Pritzker Prize names like OMA Rem Koolhaas, Kazuyo Sejima, Herzog & de Meuron, Alvaro Siza or Rafael Moneo, are considered their respective oeuvre complète. For emerging architects, being published by El Croquis is a target in itself.

In 1992 it was awarded the Gold Medal for Exports by the Spanish Chamber of Commerce, a rare accomplishment for an architectural journal. In 2014, editors Fernando Marquez Cecilia and Richard Levene received an International Fellowship from RIBA. Writing in Architects' Journal, Greg Pitcher cited "the exceptional quality of their highly selective publications" and their work in supporting promising young architects, through which they have "created retrospectively an international Who’s Who of the architecture of the late 20th and early 21st centuries."

In 2026, the magazine received the Premio Compromiso ("Commitment Award") at the Premios Arquitectura organised by the Superior Council of Spanish Architects' Associations (CSCAE), in recognition of its role in the critical dissemination of architecture.

El Croquis Editorial is also noted for their exhibition gallery in El Escorial (Madrid), housing a large collection of architectural models in constant rotation.

== Publications ==
=== El Croquis (Architectural Magazine) ===
Number	Title	Country
020	Rafael Moneo	Spain
030	Enric Miralles; Carme Pinos	Spain
032/33	Sáenz de Oiza	Spain
037	Morphosis Architects 1986-	United States
038	Santiago Calatrava	Spain
040	Coop Himmelb(l)au	Austria
041	Peter Eisenman 1986-1989	United States
042	Mark MacK Architects	United States
044	Tadao Ando	Japan
045	Frank Gehry	United States
047	Bolles+Wilson	Germany
049/50	Enric Miralles	Spain
051	Bonell/Gil / Ruis / De Las Casas/ Lorenzo / Vazquez Consuegra / Mangado	Spain
052	Zaha Hadid 1983-1992	United Kingdom
053	OMA: Rem Koolhaas 1987-1992	Netherlands
054	Juan Navarro Baldeweg 1982-1992	Spain
055/56	Spanish Architecture 1992	Spain
057	Santiago Calatrava 1990-1992	Spain
058	Tadao Ando	Japan
059	Morphosis Architects 1988-1993	United States
060	Herzog & de Meuron 1983-1993	Switzerland
061	Elías TorresJosé Antonio Martínez Lapeña	Spain
062/63	Spanish Architecture 1993	Spain
064	Rafael Moneo	Spain
065/66	Jean Nouvel 1987-1998	France
067	Bolles+WilsonElia Zenghelis	GermanyGreece
068/69	Álvaro Siza	Portugal
070	Spanish Architecture 1994	Spain
071	Toyo Ito 1986-1995	Japan
072 I	Ben van Berkel	Netherlands
072 II	Enric Miralles	Spain
073 I	Zaha Hadid	United Kingdom
073 II	Juan Navarro Baldeweg 1992-1995	Spain
074+75	Frank Gehry	United States
076	Spanish Architecture 1995: Modernism, Avant Garde and Neo-Avant Garde	Spain
077 I	Kazuyo Sejima & Ryue Nishizawa (SANAA)	Japan
077 II	Waro Kishi	Japan
078	Steven Holl	United States
079	OMA: Rem Koolhaas	Netherlands
080	Daniel Libeskind 1987-1996	Poland
081/82	Spanish Architecture 1996: From the deep plan towards anamorphic plan	Spain
083	Peter Eisenman 1990-1997	United States
084	Herzog & de Meuron	Switzerland
085	Wiel Arets 1993-1997	Netherlands
086	MVRDV	Netherlands
087	David Chipperfield	United Kingdom
088/89	WORLDS [one] 1998	x
090	Spanish Architecture 1997-1998: Towards an Artificial Landscape	Spain
091	WORLDS [two] 1998	x
092	WORLDS [three] 1998	x
093	Steven Holl	United States
094	Neutelings Riedijk Architects	Netherlands
095	Álvaro Siza	Portugal
096/97	En proceso	Spain
098	Rafael Moneo	Spain
099	Kazuyo Sejima & Ryue Nishizawa (SANAA) 1995-2000	Japan
100/101	Enric Miralles 1996-2000	Spain
102	Annette Gigon/Mike Guyer 1989-2000	Switzerland
103	Zaha Hadid 1996-2001	United Kingdom
104	Dominique Perrault 1990-2001	France
105	Bolles+Wilson 1995-2001	Germany
106/107	En proceso	Spain
108	Steven Holl 1998-2002	United States
109/110	Herzog & de Meuron 1998-2002	Switzerland
111	MVRDV 1997-2002	Netherlands
112-113	Jean Nouvel 1994-2002	France
114 [I]	Sauerbruch Hutton 1997-2003	Germany
114 [II]	Njiric+Njiric 1997-2003	Croatia
115/116	En proceso / In progress. FOA 1996-2003 Mansilla+Tuñón 2001-2003 RCR 1999-2003	Spain
117	Frank Gehry 1996-2003	United States
118	Cero.9Abalos & HerrerosNo.mad	Spain
119	Sistemas de trabajo / Work systems. Federico Soriano, Juan Domingo Santos, Selgascano, Manuel Ocaña, Carlos Arroyo, Eleonora Guidotti, Solid Arquitectura, Aranguren+Gallegos, Nieto Sobejano	Spain
120	David Chipperfield 1998-2004	United Kingdom
121/122	Kazuyo Sejima & Ryue Nishizawa (SANAA)	Japan
123	Toyo Ito 2001-2005	Japan
124	Eduardo Souto de Moura 1995-2005	Portugal
125	Stéphane Beel 1992-2005	Belgium
126	Xaveer De Geyter 1992-2005	Belgium
127	John Pawson 1995-2005	United Kingdom
128	Josep Llinás 2000-2005	Spain
129/130	Herzog & de Meuron 2002-2006	Switzerland
131/132	OMA 1996-2006	Netherlands
133	Juan Navarro Baldeweg 1997-2006	Spain
134/135	OMA 1996-2007	Netherlands
136/137	Sistemas de trabajo II. Arquitectura española 2004-2007	Spain
138	RCR Arquitectes	Spain
139	SANAA 2004-2008 Sejima + Nishizawa	Japan
140	Álvaro Siza 2001-2008	Portugal
141	Steven Holl 2004-2008	United States
142	Prácticas arquitectónicas. Arquitectura española 2008	Spain
143	Annette Gigon / Mike Guyer 2001-2008	Switzerland
144	EMBT 2000-2009 Miralles/Tagliabue	Spain
145	Christian Kerez 1992-2009	Switzerland
146	Eduardo Souto de Moura 2005-2009	Portugal
147	Toyo Ito 2005-2009	Japan
148	Spanish Architecture 2010: Collective Experiment Vol.I	Spain
149	Spanish Architecture 2010: Collective Experiment Vol.II	Spain
150	David Chipperfield 2006-2009. Conciliación de contrarios.	United Kingdom
151	Sou Fujimoto 2003-2010	Japan
152/153	Herzog & de Meuron 2005-2010	Switzerland
154	Aires Mateus 2002-2011	Portugal
155	SANAA 2008-2011 Sejima + Nishizawa	Japan
156	Valerio Olgiati 1996-2011	Switzerland
157	Studio Mumbai 2003-2011	India
158	John Pawson 2006-2011	United Kingdom
159	Neutelings Riedijk 2003-2012	Netherlands
160	Bevk Perović 2004-2012	Slovenia
161	Mansilla+Tuñón 1992-2012	Spain
162	RCR_Arquitectes 2007-2012	Spain
163/164	Glenn Murcutt 1980-2012	Australia
165	Sean Godsell 1997-2013	Australia
166	Caruso St John 1993-2013	United Kingdom
167	Smiljan Radic 2003-2013	Chile
168/169	Álvaro Siza 2008-2013	Portugal
170	João Luís Carrilho da Graça 2002-2013	Portugal
171	Selgascano 2003-2013	Spain
172	Steven Holl 2008-2014	United States
173	MVRDV 2003-2014	Netherlands
174/175	David Chipperfield 2010-2014	United Kingdom
176	Eduardo Souto de Moura 2009-2014	Portugal
177/178	Lacaton & Vassal 1993-2015	France
179/180	SANAA 2011-2015 Sejima + Nishizawa	Japan
181	MGM - Barozzi Veiga - Harquitectes - Selgascano	Spain
182	Christian Kerez 2010-2015, Junya Ishigami 2005-2015	Switzerland, Japan
183	Jean Nouvel 2007-2016, Junya Ishigami 2005-2015	France
184	AMID.CERO9 2010-2016, MOS 2008-2016	Spain, United States
185	OFFICE 2003-2016	Belgium
186	Aires Mateus 2011-2016	Portugal
187	Sergison Bates architects 2004-2016	United Kingdom
188	Tham & Videgard 2005-2017	Sweden
189-	Alfredo PAya 2010-2017, Toni Gironès 2003-2017, José Maria Sanchez Garcia 2010-2017	United Kingdom
190	RCR Arquitectes 2012-2017	Spain
191	Go Hasegawa 2005-2017	Japan
192	6a Architects 2009-2017	United Kingdom
193	Manuel Cervantes 2011-2018	Mexico
194	Brandlhuber+ 1996-2018	Germany
195	Carmody Groarke 2009-2018	United Kingdom
196 I + II	KARAMUK KUO 2009-2018, TEd'A arquitectes 2010-2018	Switzerland, Spain
197	BRUTHER 2012-2018	France
198	Johnston Marklee & Associates 2005-2019	United States
199	Smiljan Radic 2013-2019	Chile
200	Studio Mumbai 2012-2019	India
201	Caruso St John 2013-2019	United Kingdom
202	Bernardo Bader 2009-2019	Austria
203	HArquitectes 2010-2019	Spain
204	Xaveer De Geyter 2006-2020	Belgium
205	SANAA I 2015-2020	Japan
206	Anne Holtrop 2009-2020	Netherlands
207	Estúdio Gustavo Utrabo 2015-2020	Brazil
208	DOGMA 2002-2021	Belgium
209	Roger Boltshauser 2002-2021	Switzerland
210/211	Gion A. Caminada 1995-2021	Switzerland
212	Palinda Kannangara 2005-2022	Sri Lanka
213	Taller Héctor Barroso 2015-2022	Mexico
214	Pezo von Ellrichshausen 2005-2022	Chile
215/216	Alvaro Siza 2015-2022	Portugal
217 [I]	Arrhov Frick 2015-2022	Sweden
217 [II]	Groupwork 2012-2022	United Kingdom
218	Eduardo Souto de Moura 2015-2023	Portugal
219	Instituto Balear de la Vivienda (IBAVI) 2019-2023	Spain
220/221	SANAA 2015-2023	Japan
222	David Chipperfield 2015-2023	United Kingdom
223	Tuñon y Albornoz 2013-2023	Spain
224	Christian Kerez 2015-2024	Switzerland
225	Macías Peredo 2014-2024	Mexico
226	OFFICE 2017-2024	Belgium
227	Alberto Ponis	Italy
228	RCR Arquitectes 2017-2024	Spain
229	Aires Mateus 2018-2025	Portugal
230	HArquitectes 2021-2025	Spain
231	Selgascano 2021-2025	Spain
232	Smiljan Radic 2019-2025	Chile
233	Manuel Cervantes 2018-2026	Mexico
234	Peris + Toral 2015-2026	Spain
235	Aulets 2003-2026	Spain

=== Books ===
- 1 Adolf Loos. Escritos I 1897-1909
- 2 Adolf Loos. Escritos II 1910-1933
- 3 Otto Wagner. La arquitectura de nuestro tiempo
- 4 Le Corbusier. Acerca del Purismo 1918-1926
- 5 Mies van der Rohe. La palabra sin artificio 1922-1968
- 6 Bruno Taut. Escritos expresionistas
- 7 Frank Lloyd Wright. Autobiografía 1867 [1944]
- 8 Alvar Aalto. De palabra y por escrito
- 9 Luis Barragán. Escritos y conversaciones
- 10 E.G. Asplund. Escritos 1906-1940 Cuaderno de Viaje 1913
- 11 Louis I. Kahn. Escritos, conferencias, entrevistas
- 12 Moisei Ginzburg. Escritos 1923-1930
