= Van Reeth =

Van Reeth may refer to:

- Bob Van Reeth (1943–2025), Belgian architect
- Van Reeth Glacier, glacier in Antarctica
