= Carlos Arroyo (architect) =

Spanish architect

Carlos Arroyo Zapatero is a contemporary architect, urbanist and critic from Madrid, Spain. His work claims to set the frame for a new architectural culture, language and aesthetics, through the ethics, technology and parameters of sustainability. He holds that his architecture is not designed to be photographed, but to be lived-in and enjoyed through time. He has developed a diagrammatic graphic style for his presentations which is inspirational for a whole generation of architects. In contrast, his built work is often portrayed by photographer-artists, producing innovative formats like photo-novellas, gif's, or video. His work has been exhibited in internationally renowned venues like the Venice Biennale (8th and 14th), the Institut Français d'Architecture, presented in referential publications like El Croquis, and quoted by many bloggers in the sphere.

== Biography ==
Carlos Arroyo was born on June 14, 1964. In 1990, after graduating in linguistics at the Institute of Linguistics in London, he went back to Madrid where he studied architecture at ETSAM and received ISOVER award for best PFC (Master Thesis Project) of the school in the year he graduated, 1997. He holds a PhD in Architecture since 2018. From 2000 to 2008 Arroyo was professor of Architectural Projects at Universidad de Alcalá and since 2005 at Universidad Europea de Madrid where he currently leads a Master Thesis Unit. He is an honorary member of Europan Spain National Committee as well as a member of Europan Europe Scientific Committee since 2004.

== Awards ==
- Gold Prijs Bouwmeester 2013 awarded by the Government of Flanders to OostCampus, Oostkamp.
- Archdaily's 65 Best New Buildings in the World 2012, Academie MWD
- Archdaily's 65 Best New Buildings in the World 2012, OostCampus
- Holcim Silver Award for Sustainable Construction in Europe 2011
- Nominated for the European Union Mies van der Rohe Award 2011
- International Competition Open Oproep for OostCampus. City Hall and Civic Centre. Belgium 1st prize 2008
- International Competition Open Oproep for Academie MDW Academy of Performing Arts. Belgium 1st prize 2007
- International Award; Sustainability and Innovation in Housing. EMVS. Madrid 2006
- National Competition: Ferial y zonas recreativas. Vilanueva de la Cañada. Madrid 2nd prize 2004
- International Saloni Award: Estudio y Refugio en Nuñez de Arce 2003
- International Competition EUROPAN VI. Toledo Siet 1st prize 2001
- Competition: Atico para Coleccionista en la calle de la Estrella de Madrid 1st prize 2001
- National Competition: Pabellón “Franchipolis” para Deutsche Bank. Fira de Valencia1st prize 2000
- National Competition: Centro de Día de Personas Mayores. Ayuntamiento de San Sebastian de los Reyes 2nd prize 2000
- National Competition: Museo del Agua de Tenerife. Ayuntamiento de Guimar 1st prize 1999
- Isover Award, best PFC (Thesis Project) of the year in ETSAM 1997

== Main works ==
=== Architecture ===
- Instituto Cervantes in Brussels, Belgium
- Instituto Cervantes in Berlin, Germany
- Insttuto Cervantes auditorium in London, UK
- Maison du Projet de la Lainière de Roubaix, France
- OostCampus, Oostkamp, Belgium (Open Oproep/Open Call)
- Academie MWD, Dilbeek, Belgium (Open Oproep/Open Call)
- Casa MSA6, Madrid
- Edificio TSM3, Madrid
- Casa Encuentro, Tabernas, Almería
- Casa del Amor, Madrid
- Copropiedad CLV, Válor, Granada (EMVS awards for sustainability and residential innovation)
- Complejo AAN, Salamanca

=== Projects ===
- 119 houses at Rivas Ecopolis (ING Real Estate)

=== Urbanism ===
- Eco-hood in Toledo, Toledo (Europan, 1st Prize)
- Ferial de Villanueva de la Cañada, Madrid (2nd Prize)

== Bibliography ==
=== Books (selection) ===
- Vivienda y sostenibilidad en España, Vol. 2 - Toni Solanas Ed. Gustavo Gili, Barcelona 2007
- Emergentes 06 – Ed. COAAragón, Zaragoza 2007
- Europan Generation. The reinterpreted City. - Ed. La cité de L´Architecture et du Patrimoine / Europan, Paris 2007
- Arquitecturas S.XXI - Ed. ea! Ediciones de arquitectura. Madrid 2007 - Págs.98-117
- Sostenibilidad y Tecnología en la Ciudad – Foro Civitas nova – Libro Verde - Ed. Fundación Civitas Nova. Albacete 2006
- Guía de Arquitectura de Madrid 1975-2007 -(AA.VV) Ed. EMVS Madrid 2006
- Vivienda en España - (AA.VV.) Ed. El Viso. Madrid 2006
- Freshmadrid - Ed. ea! Ediciones de arquitectura – db 10. Madrid 2006
- Catalogue of implementations. - Ed. Europan - Europe, Paris 2004
- Biennale di Venezia (Catalogo) Paisajes Internos. - Ed. Pabellón de España. Madrid 2002

=== Periodicals (selection) ===
- A+, Nº 216 (2009) - Brussel
- Minerva, Nº IV
- El Croquis, Nº 119 Madrid (2004); Nº 136/137 Madrid (2007).
- Arquitectos - Nº 181 (2007) - Madrid.
- Pasajes, Nº 94 (2008); 25 (2007) - Madrid.
- Arquitectura, Nº: 326 (2002) 344 (2006) - Madrid.
- InfoDOMUS, Nº 1 (2006) - Madrid.
- EPS – El País Semanal. Madrid, 2004
