= Liesbeth van der Pol =

Dutch architect (born 1959)

- Born: 20 January 1959 (age 67); Amsterdam, The Netherlands
- Education: Delft University of Technology
- Occupation: Architect

Liesbeth van der Pol (born 20 January 1959) is a Dutch architect. She was Chief Government Architect of the Netherlands from 2008 to 2011, the first woman to hold that position.

Born in Amsterdam, she graduated cum laude from Delft University of Technology in 1988 and set up practice in Amsterdam with Herman Zeinstra in 1989. In 2007, her firm merged with Blue Architects Amsterdam to form Dok Architecten; Van der Pol serves on its board of directors. In 1992, she received the Charlotte Köhler Prize for architecture and, in 1993, the Rotterdam-Maaskant Prize for young architects.

Van der Pol also does many guest lectures at universities and academies and has sat in on numerous juries. She was head of Man and Public Space at the Eindhoven Design Academy.
