= Europan =

Biennial architecture competition in Europe

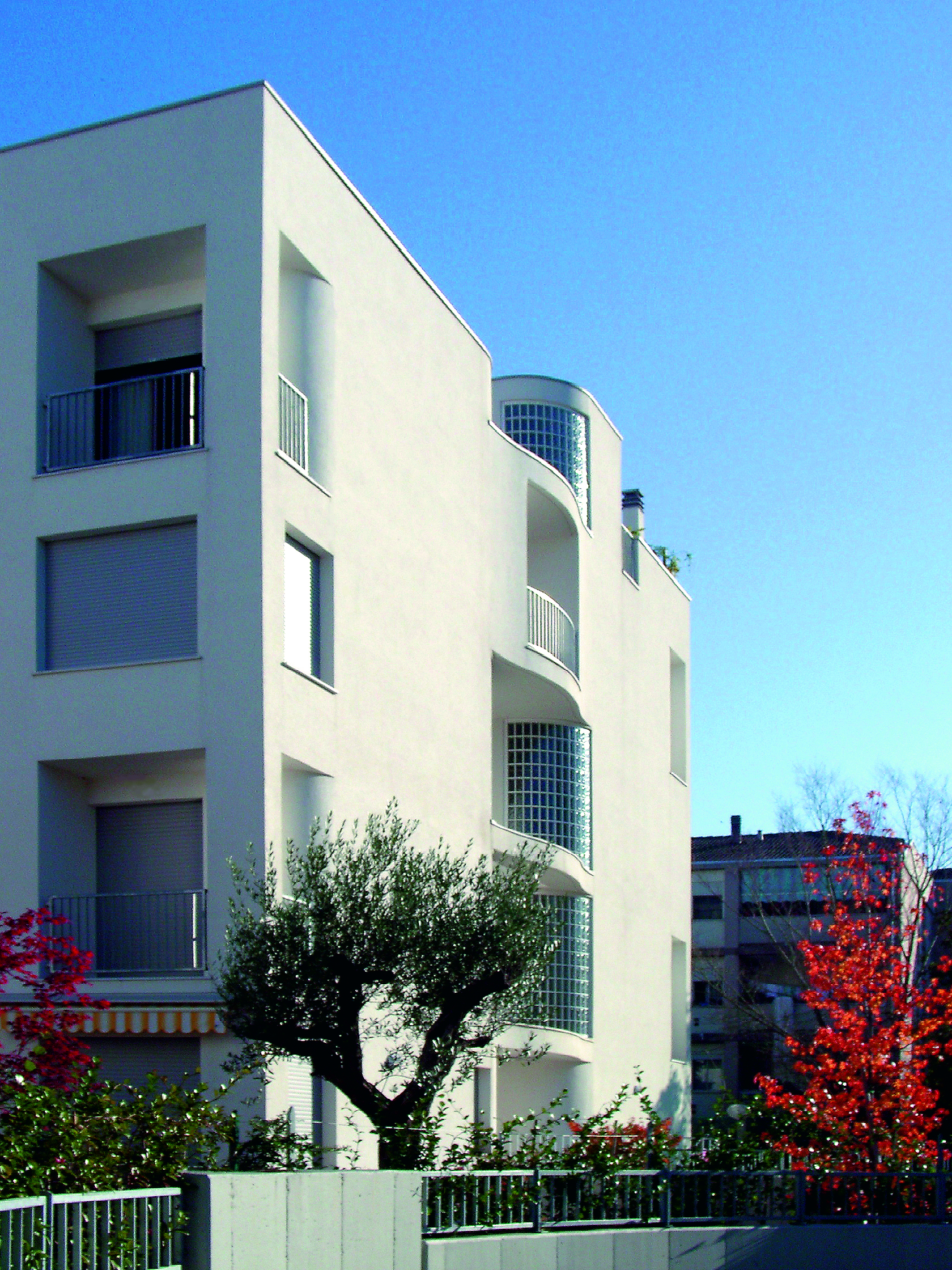
Europan 1 (1990), 18 housing units in Favaro Veneto (Venice) by Ruggero Lenci, Nilda Valentin.

Europan is a biennial competition for young architects under 40 years of age to design innovative housing and urban planning for sites across Europe. It is considered the world's largest (and the smartest) competition in the field. The competition encourages architects to address social, cultural and economic changes occurring in towns and cities and offers the opportunity for cross-cultural learning and networking for the architects and site promoters involved.

== Structure ==
The initiative was founded in 1989 and is supported by 19 European countries. The organizer of these competitions is the “Europan Europe” association, based in Paris, which forms the European umbrella organisation for a network of national European organisations. The President of the association is currently Manuel Blanco, and the General Secretary is Didier Rebois. The respective national organisations consist of representatives of public administrations, cities and municipalities, as well as representatives of the clients and architectural associations.

The initiative has a network of experts, architects, urban planners and around 250 European cities, who jointly develop and analyse the topics in one large forum held every autumn in a different European city.

== Goals ==
The aim of the competition is to find innovative and experimental approaches for locations proposed by European cities and to promote dialogue on architecture and urban planning locally and internationally, as well as to support talented young architects from the announcement to the realisation of their ideas. Furthermore, the competition is intended to help the participating municipalities and creatives to build up Europe-wide networks.

The participants must be under 40 years of age. They can join together to form working groups and make proposals for several locations in parallel. In each country, a national jury will select the winners for the respective locations. Europan offers young European architects the opportunity to make a name for themselves internationally outside the ordinary competition system, with extraordinary designs. This is favoured by the possibility of also working on locations outside the own national border, as well as the great attention that the competition and its publications enjoys in expert circles. Previous award winners include some well-known offices such as Riegler Riewe (Graz, Austria), MVRDV (Netherlands), NL Architects (Netherlands), Njiric & Njiric (Croatia), Carlos Arroyo Architects (Madrid,Spain), Bogdan & Van Broeck (Belgium), and nbundm* (Ingolstadt, Munich).

== Topics of the competitions ==
Source: Europan Europe website.

- Europan 01 (1989–1990): Changing lifestyles and housing architecture
- Europan 02 (1990–1991): Living in the city – recovering urban spaces
- Europan 03 (1992–1994): At home in the City – Urbanization of Urban Quarters
- Europan 04 (1994–1996): Building the city upon the city – transformation of contemporary areas
- Europan 05 (1997–2000): New landscapes of urban living
- Europan 06 (2000–2002): In between cities – Architecture in the Urban Renewal Process
- Europan 07 (2003–2004): Suburban challenge – Urban intensity and diversity of living
- Europan 08 (2004–2006): European urbanity – Strategies and solutions for the future of the European city
- Europan 09 (2006–2008): European urbanity – Sustainable city and new urban spaces
- Europan 10 (2009–2011): Inventing Urbanity: Regeneration – Revitalisation – Colonization
- Europan 11 (2011–2012): Territories and ways of life – which architecture for sustainable cities?
- Europan 12 (2013–2014): The Adaptable City
- Europan 13 (2015–2016): The Adaptable City II
- Europan 14 (2017–2018): The Productive City
- Europan 15 (2019–2020): The Productive City II
- Europan 16 (2021–2022): Living Cities - Living Milieus I
- Europan 17 (2023–2024): Living Cities - Living Milieus II
