= Christian Kerez =

Swiss architect (born 1962 in Zurich)

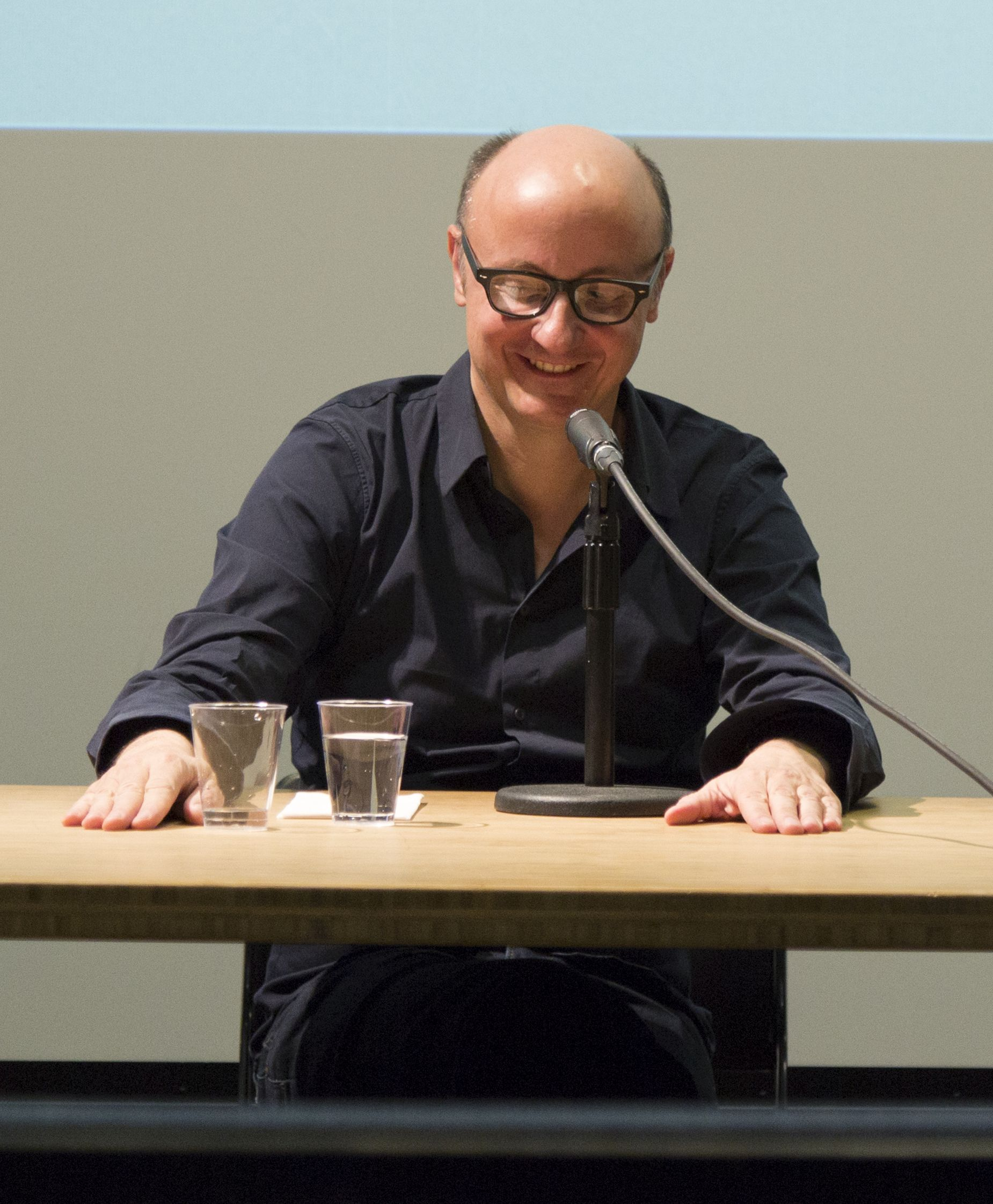
- Born: Christian Georg Kerez; 27 May 1962 (age 64); Zürich, Switzerland
- Education: Swiss Federal Institute of Technology
- Occupation: Architect
- Website: Official website

Christian Georg Kerez (born 27 May 1962) is a Swiss architect, architectural photographer and professor.

== Early life and education ==
Kerez was born 27 May 1962 in Maracaibo, Venezuela, one of two children, to Christoph Kerez (1927-2019) and Gisela (née Bromberg). His father was the president of the Swiss gemstone industry association. He is distantly related to James Kerez-Paravicini, who aided founding the Anglo-Swiss Condensed Milk Company. Until 1991 he completed his studies in architecture at ETH Zurich.

== Career ==
Christian Kerez studied architecture at ETH Zurich until 1991 and then worked with Rudolf Fontana in Domat/Ems. Kerez started out with architectural photography and founded his architecture office in Zurich in 1993. Christian Kerez has been working at the ETH since 2001, first as a visiting professor, from 2003 as an assistant professor and since 2009 as a professor; he invited Raphael Zuber, Hermann Czech, Arno Brandlhuber, Bijoy Jain, Anne Holtrop, Go Hasegawa, Smiljan Radic and Junya Ishigami. Between 2012 and 2013 he held the Kenzo Tange Chair at Harvard University Graduate School of Design in Cambridge. At the 15th International Architecture Exhibition at the Venice Biennale Kerez designed the Swiss Pavilion.

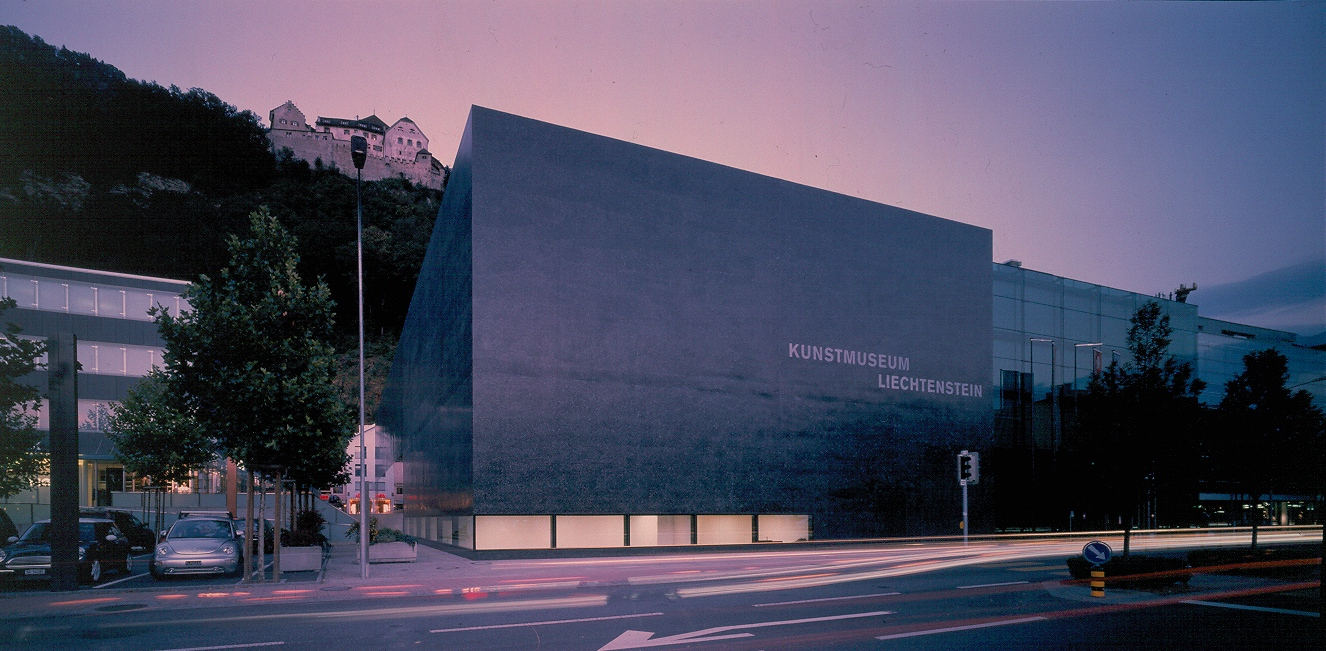
Kunstmuseum Liechtenstein, Vaduz

== Work ==
Kerez has photographed for Valerio Olgiati, Herzog & de Meuron, Bearth & Deplazes and Miroslav Šik.

=== At the office of Rudolf Fontana ===
- 1992–1993: Oberrealta Chapel, Cazis
- 1992–1993: Mortuary, Bonaduz

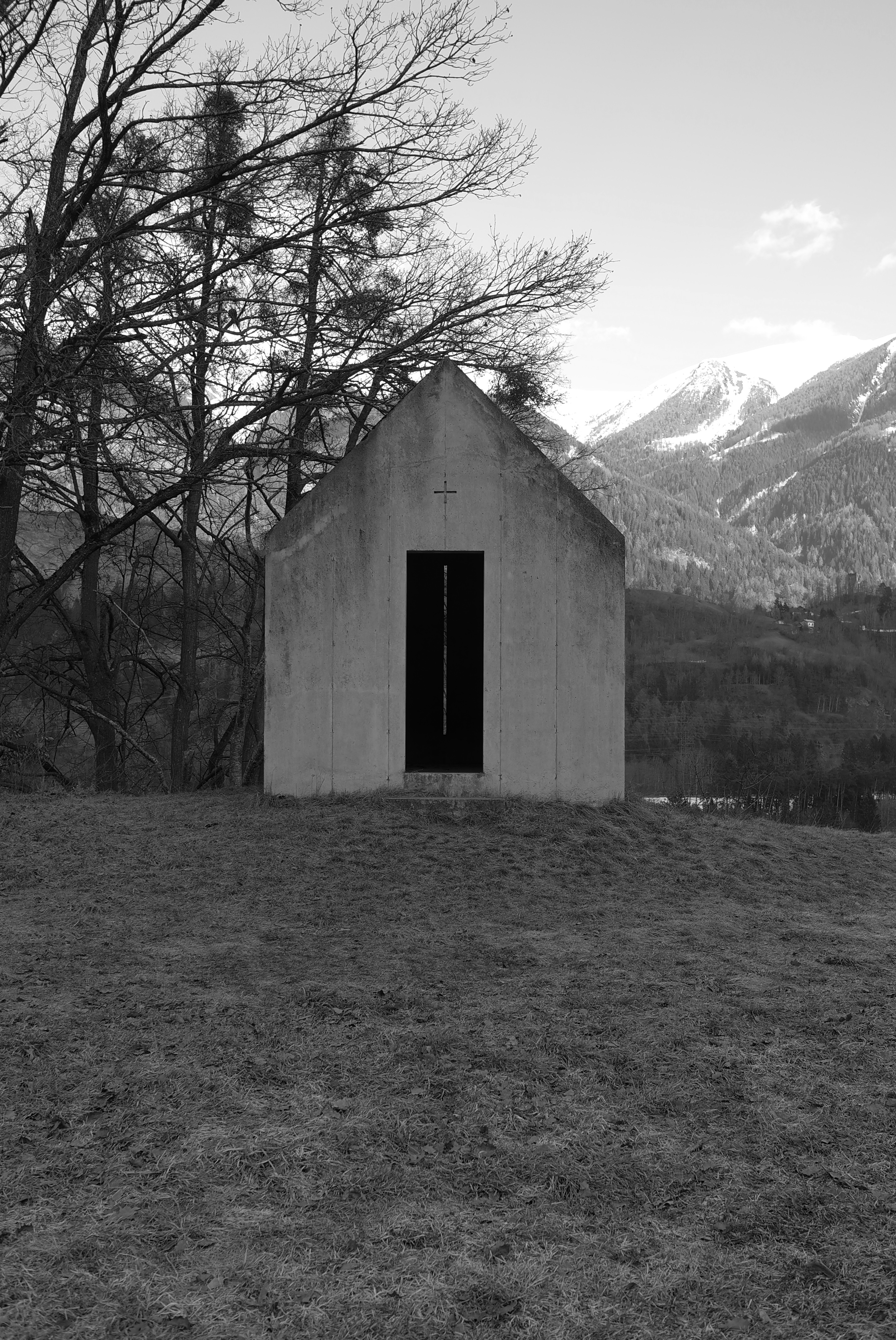
St. Nepomuk, Cazis

=== Own buildings ===
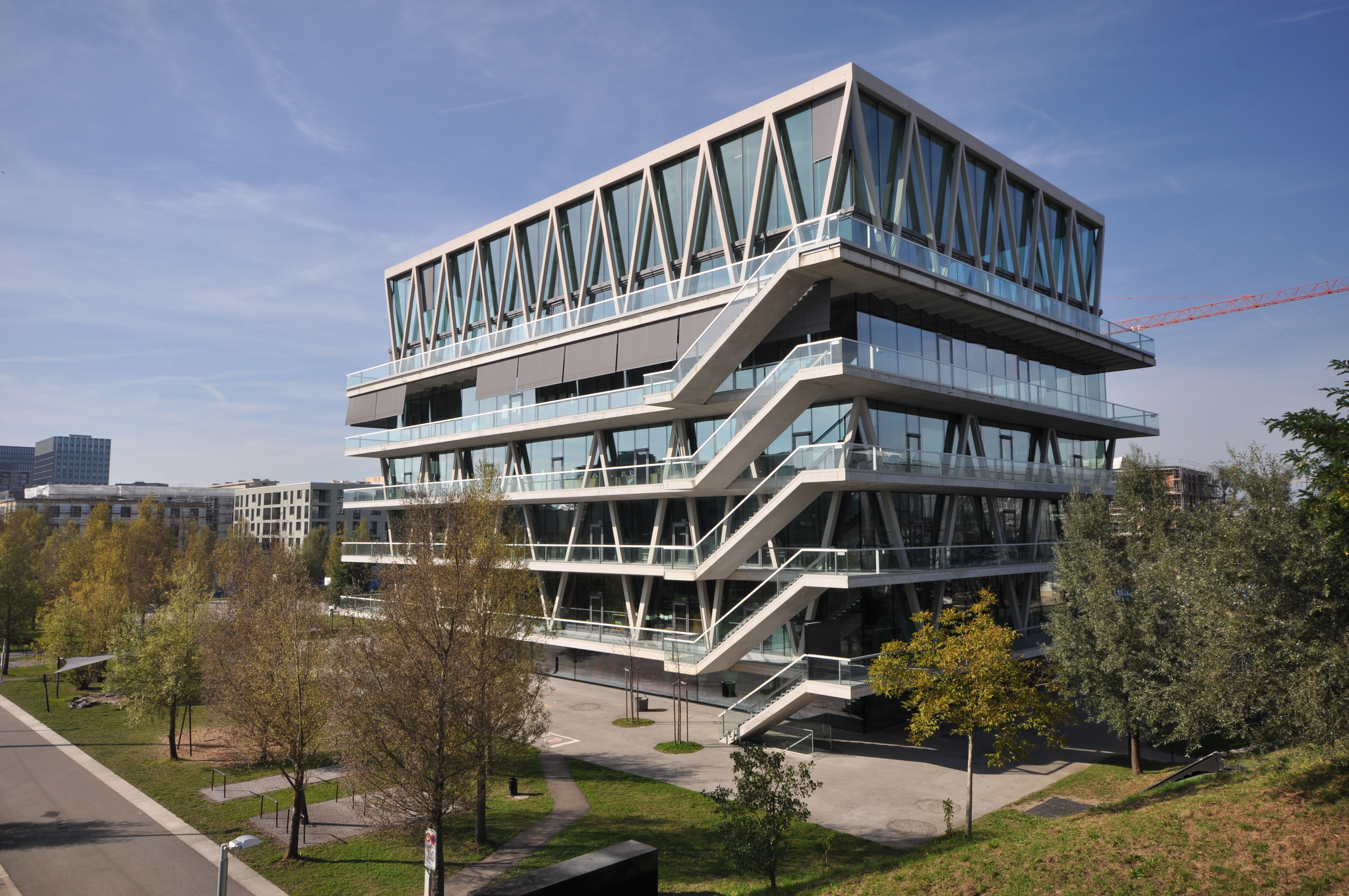
Schoolhouse Leutschenbach, Zurich

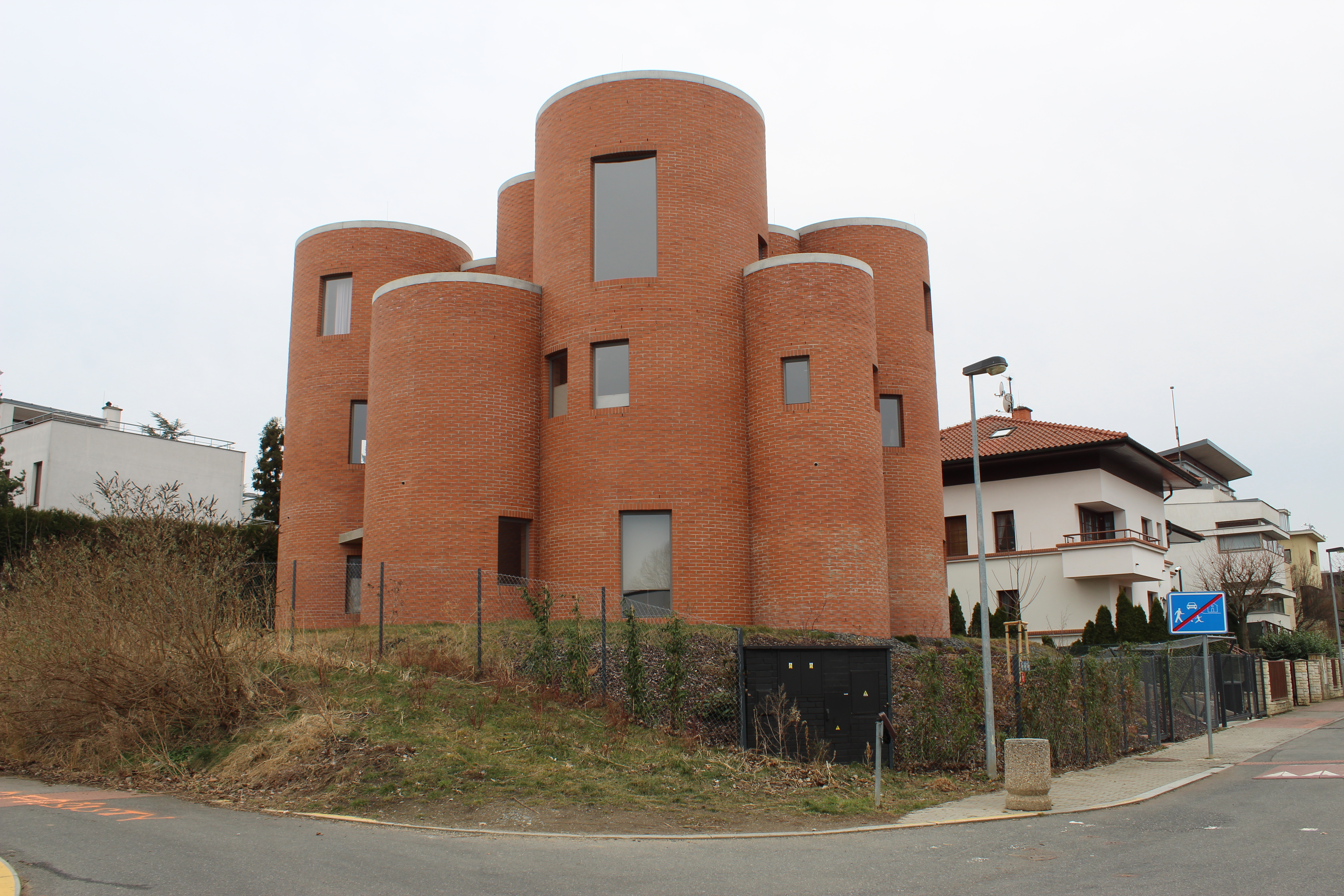
House Tomio Okamura, Prague

- 1998–2000: Kunstmuseum Liechtenstein, Vaduz with Morger & Degelo, Basel
- 1999–2003: Apartment building on Forsterstrasse, Zurich
- 1999–2003: Schoolhouse Breiten, Eschenbach (SG)
- 2002–2009: Schoolhouse Leutschenbach, Zurich with landscape architect Maurus Schifferli
- 2004–2007: House with one wall, Zurich
- 2006–2013: House with a Lakeview, Thalwil
- 2006–2014: Museum of Modern Art, Warsaw competition 1st prize
- 2008: Holcim Competence Center, Holderbank competition 1st prize
- 2009–2014: House with a missing column', Zurich
- 2009–2013: Porto Seguro Housing Development Project, Paraisopolis, São Paulo
- 2013–2018: Office Building, Lyon Confluence Îlot A3, Lyon
- 2013–2021: House Tomio Okamura, Prague
- 2020 – 2026 Textilmuseum, competition, 1st prize, ongoing, St. Gallen
- 2021: The Bahrain Pavilion at Expo 2020, Dubai (delayed one year because of the COVID-19 pandemic)

== Awards and distinctions (selection) ==
- 1999: Swiss Art Award
- 2005: Betonpreis 05, 1st prize for the apartment building on Forsterstrasse, Zurich
- 2011: European Steel Design Award, for school building Leutschenbach Zurich
- 2012: Fellow of the Royal Institute of British Architects
- 2012: Kenzo Tange Chair for Architecture, Harvard University Graduate School of Design, Cambridge
- 2014: recognition - Daylight-Award for school building Leutschenbach Zurich
- 2015: Holcim Awards Europe 2014, Honorable Mention to energy-efficient office building in Holderbank, Switzerland

== Bibliography ==
- Gerold Wiederin, Helmut Federle: Nachtwallfahrtskapelle Locherboden. Publ. by Kunsthaus Bregenz with Edelbert Köb, text by Johannes Gachnang, photo-essay by Christian Kerez, Verlag Gerd Hatje, Stuttgart 1997, ISBN 3-7757-0736-0
- Kunstmuseum Liechtenstein, Morger Degelo Kerez Architects, texts by Hans Frei, Friedemann Malsch, Norbert Jansen, photo-essay by Thomas Flechtner. Lars Müller Publishers, Baden 2000, ISBN 978-3-907078-25-9
- Valerio Olgiati, Das Gelbe Haus, Kunsthaus Bregenz, archiv kunst architektur, Werkdokumente 19, 2000, Hatje Cantz Verlag, ISBN 3-7757-1004-3, 82 pages
- Les échelles de la réalité. L’architecture de Christian Kerez. Exhibition catalogue. Texts by Martin Steinmann and Christian Kerez, EPFL, Lausanne 2006
- Conflicts Politics Construction Privacy Obsession. Materials on the Work of Christian Kerez. Texts by Hubertus Adam, Marcel Andino, Hans Frei, Tibor Joanelly. Moritz Küng (ed.) and deSingel international arts campus, Antwerp and Hatje Cantz Verlag, Ostfildern 2008, ISBN 978-3-7757-2280-3
- El Croquis 145: Christian Kerez 2000-2009. Fundamentos arquitectonicos, basics on architecture. Texts by Georg Frank, Hans Frei and Christian Kerez, El Croquis, Madrid 2009, ISBN 978-84-88386-54-0
- Christian Kerez: Uncertain Certainty, Publ.: Toto, Tokyo 2013, ISBN 978-4-88706-334-1
- El Croquis 182: Christian Kerez 2010-2015. With a Glossary by Christian Kerez, El Croquis, Madrid 2015; ISBN 978-84-88386-87-8

== Exhibitions (selection) ==
- 2006: Les échelles de la réalité. L’architecture de Christian Kerez, with catalogue, EPFL Lausanne
- 2006: Innenansichten, Arbeiten von Christian Kerez, Swiss Architecture Museum, Basle
- 2008: Progetti 1988–2007, Accademia di Architettura di Mendrisio
- 2008: Conflicts Politics Construction Privacy Obsession, De Singel Int. Art Campus, Antwerp and CASA Vertigo/ Technische Universiteit, Eindhoven
- 2009: Traum & Wirklichkeit, aut. architektur und tirol, Innsbruck
- 2010: People meet in Architecture, Italian Pavilion (participation), 12th International Architecture Biennale in Venice, curated by: Kazuyo Sejima
- 2013: Contrast & Continuity, Harvard University Graduate School of Design, Cambridge
- 2013: The Rule of the Game, Toto Gallery MA, Tokyo
- 2016: Incidental Space, Pavilion of Switzerland, 15th Venice Biennale

== Personal life ==
He is married to Catherine (formerly Dumont d'Ayot; born 1965) and resides in Zürich.
