= Oana Bogdan =

Belgian-Romanian architect

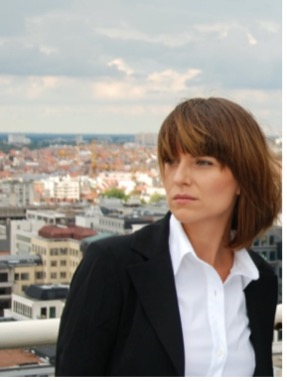
- Born: December 9, 1977
- Occupation: Architect
- Awards: Oana Bogdan won Europan 7 in 2004 and the Bucharest Architecture Biennale in 2010, and has been nominated three times for the Mies van der Rohe Award (2015, 2019, 2022).

Oana Bogdan (born December 9, 1977, Sighișoara) is an architect with Belgian and Romanian nationality. Together with Leo Van Broeck, she founded the architectural firm Bogdan & Van Broeck. She is considered as an authority in the field of architecture and is much in demand as a jury member for architecture awards.

== Biography and education ==
Her mother was a French teacher and her father an engineer. She has two sisters. She took piano lessons for eight years.

Oana Bogdan studied architecture and urban planning at Ion Mincu University in Bucharest. In 1999, she came to Belgium on an Erasmus scholarship, where she studied architecture at KU Leuven and University of Antwerp in Belgium. Between 2013 and 2015, she earned an MBA degree from the Vlerick Business School, and she is now a graduate of the University of Antwerp.

== Career ==
Bogdan worked at VBM architect in Leuven. In 2007, she founded the architectural firm BOGDAN & VAN BROECK together with Leo Van Broeck. She oversees the overall strategy of the practice and is closely involved in the genesis of all designs. Oana Bogdan anchors the work of BOGDAN & VAN BROECK in the ongoing public debate and questions the traditional role of the architect. Her involvement in societal affairs, as well as in political debates, contributes to raising awareness of the holistic approach to regenerative urban development.

She taught architecture and urban planning at the KU Leuven for many years. Since 2005 she is member of the Order of Architects. Oana Bogdan was a member of the jury of the Flemish Culture Prize in 2007, of the "Unesco Experts Committee" of the City of Bruges, of the Advisory Committee for Architecture and Design of the Flemish Government and of the Royal Committee for Monuments and Landscapes of the Flemish Region. Since 2020, she has been a member of the Board of Directors of the cultural platform A+ Architecture in Belgium. Her advice is in demand as an expert by various organizations.

In addition, she was interim State Secretary for Culture in the Romanian Government in 2016, where, among other things, she drafted a new legislative code for cultural heritage and historically protected the Roșia Montană area.

Bogdan co-founded the Romanian political party PLUS in 2018.

== Membership of jury's and committees (selection) ==
Oana was member of several jury's of architecture prizes, awards or committees :

- 2007–2012, member of the Advisory Committee for Architecture and Design of the Flemish Government, Belgium
- 2016, Concurs Annual al Studentilor Arhitecti (CASA), Romania
- 2016, president of the committee the Prijs Wivina Demeester voor Excellent Bouwheerschap (Flemish Government Architect), Belgium
- 2017, Nordic Architecture Fair Award
- 2020, member of the jury for the Ultimas Architecture, the cultural awards of the Flemish Community
- 2021, ambassador of Women in Architecture Belgium
- 2021, member of the board of directors of BVA (Professional Association of Architects), Belgium
- 2021, Rotterdam Architecture Prize (president)
- 2021, president of the expert committee Good Living of the Brussels-Capital Region

== Awards and nominations ==
Oana Bogdan won Europan 7 in 2004 and the Bucharest Architecture Biennale in 2010, and has been nominated three times for the Mies van der Rohe Award (2015, 2019, 2022).

This article or an earlier version of it is a (partial) translation of the article Oana Bogdan on Wikipedia, licensed under the Creative Commons Attribution-ShareAlike.
