= Wim Quist =

Dutch architect (1930–2022)

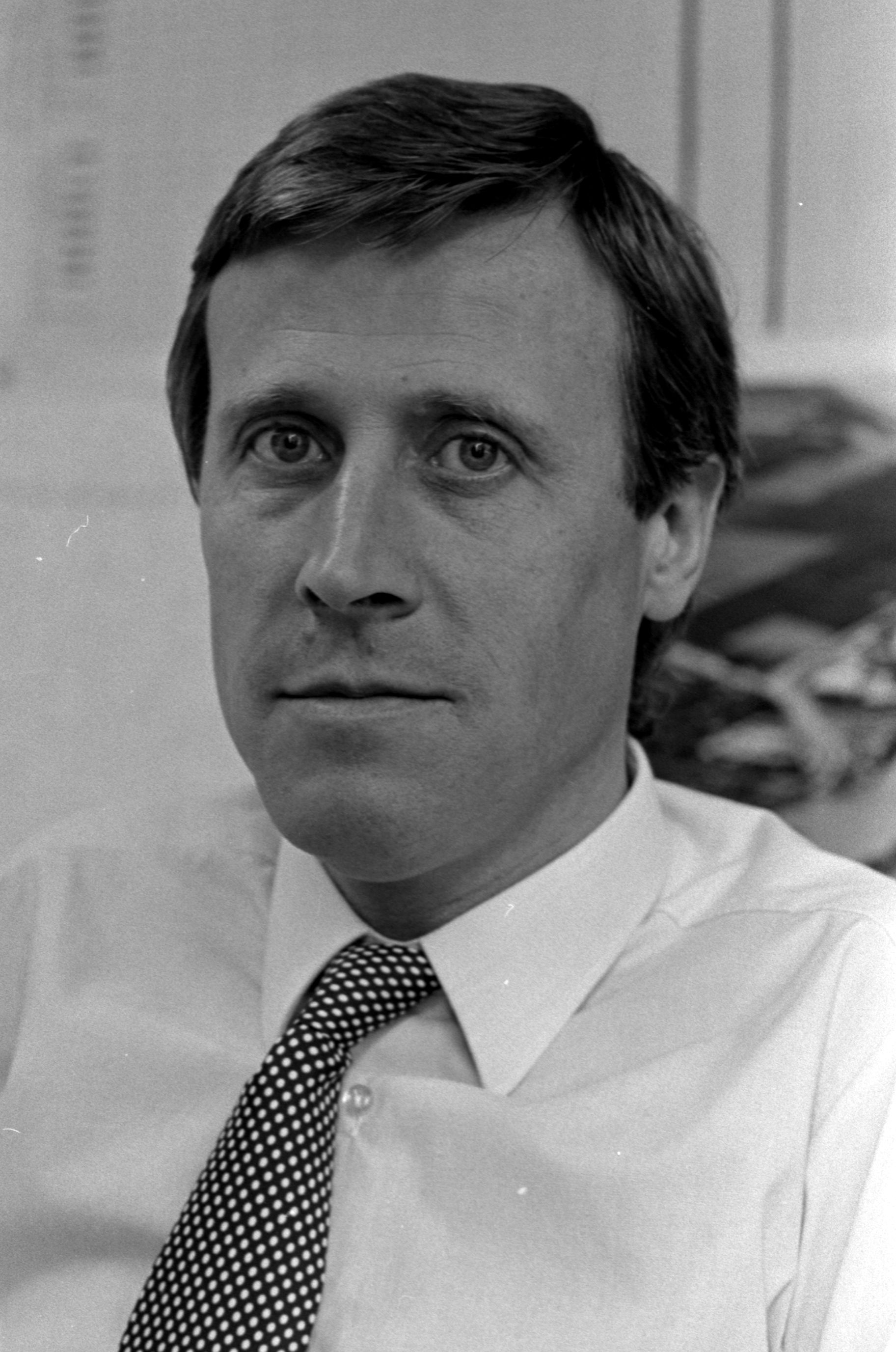
Wim Quist (1973)

Wim Quist (27 October 1930 – 9 July 2022) was a Dutch architect. Part of the modernist tradition of architecture, his style was dominated by rectangular, triangular and circular forms. His buildings focussed on the relationship between the building and its surroundings, with the function of the building itself being central. He rejected the use of unnecessary decoration. He continued designing buildings from 1960 until retiring in 2003 - his architectural legacy is now visible all over the Netherlands.

== Professional life ==
Following his graduation from the Academie van Bouwkunst (Architecture Academy) in Amsterdam in the late 1950s, Quist began working at Rotterdam Council. He was, however, already being celebrated as an architect, having been awarded the Prix de Rome in 1958. Shortly after he established his own architectural company. From then on began a steady stream of successful commissions, many of which were for public or utilitarian purposes. His water processing plant at Oud-Beijerland (completed in 1965) was an early example of his stark geometric forms. This would be accompanied by two later water-processing plants with eye-catching designs (the 1974 Petrusplaat in the Biesbosch area and in the Kralingen neighbourhood of Rotterdam in 1977). By 1974, his renown led to him being appointed Rijksarchitect, a position he would hold until 1979.

In the 1980s, his public sector commissions continued. Several Dutch museums were designed by Quist. He had already designed the Kroller Muller Museum (finished in 1977), a low, rectangular glass-walled build in the middle of a forest and described as being "meticulously detailed and equally sober modernism at the service of art". The Maritime Museum in Rotterdam, completed in 1986, has been described by one critic "as demanding, but not inaccessible; finite, but not closed; austere ... but not cold." He would continue in 1989 with a museum of science and education in The Hague (the Museon), whose geometric forms worked in tandem with the nearby Kunstmuseum by the early twentieth-century Dutch architect Hendrik Berlage and a museum hidden in sand dunes, the Beelden aan Zee, also in The Hague.

In 1995, his architectural office merged with the firm of Wintermans, becoming Quist Wintermans Architekten. In 2003 he retired from the firm as an architect. He would continue to be involved in architectural debates in the Netherlands, particularly when he objected to modifications on some of his earlier buildings, for example the water works complex in Kralingen, and the town hall in Zeewolde. In the example of the Kralingen water works, a court ruling determined that the water company had to work with Quist in order to update the modifications planned by another architectural firm.

== Some of Quist's works ==
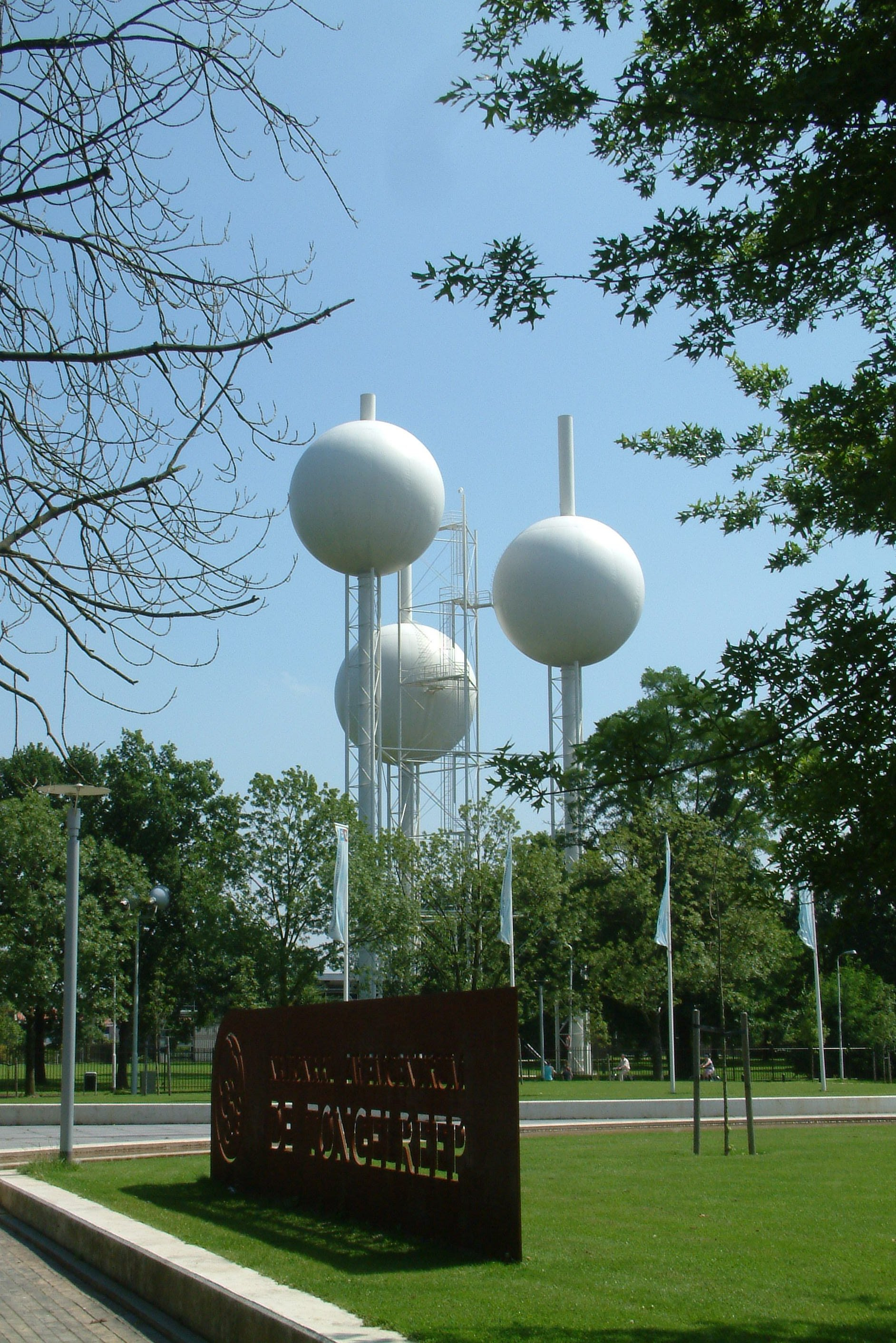
Water Balls Eindhoven

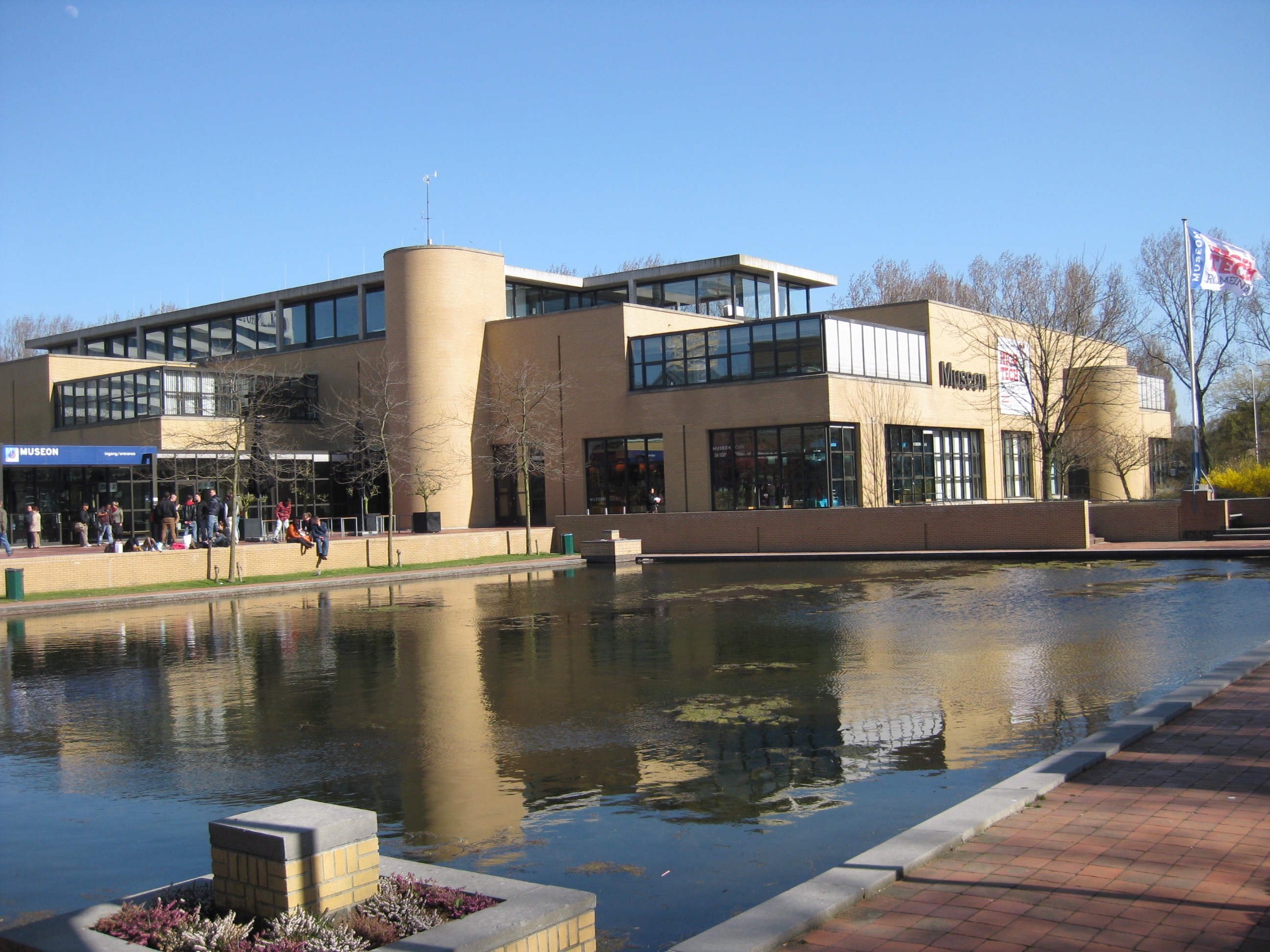
Museon The Hague

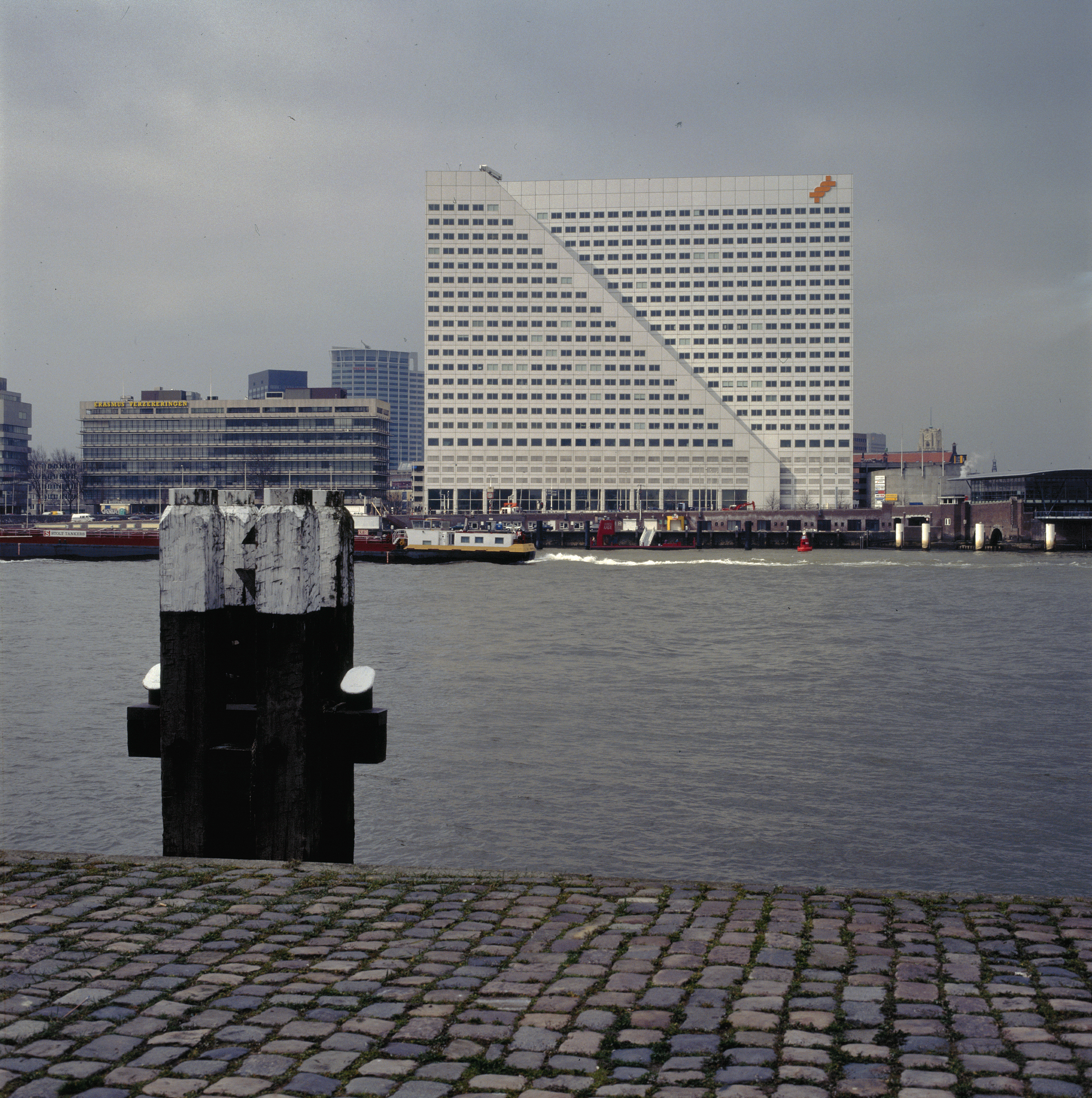
Willemswerf Rotterdam

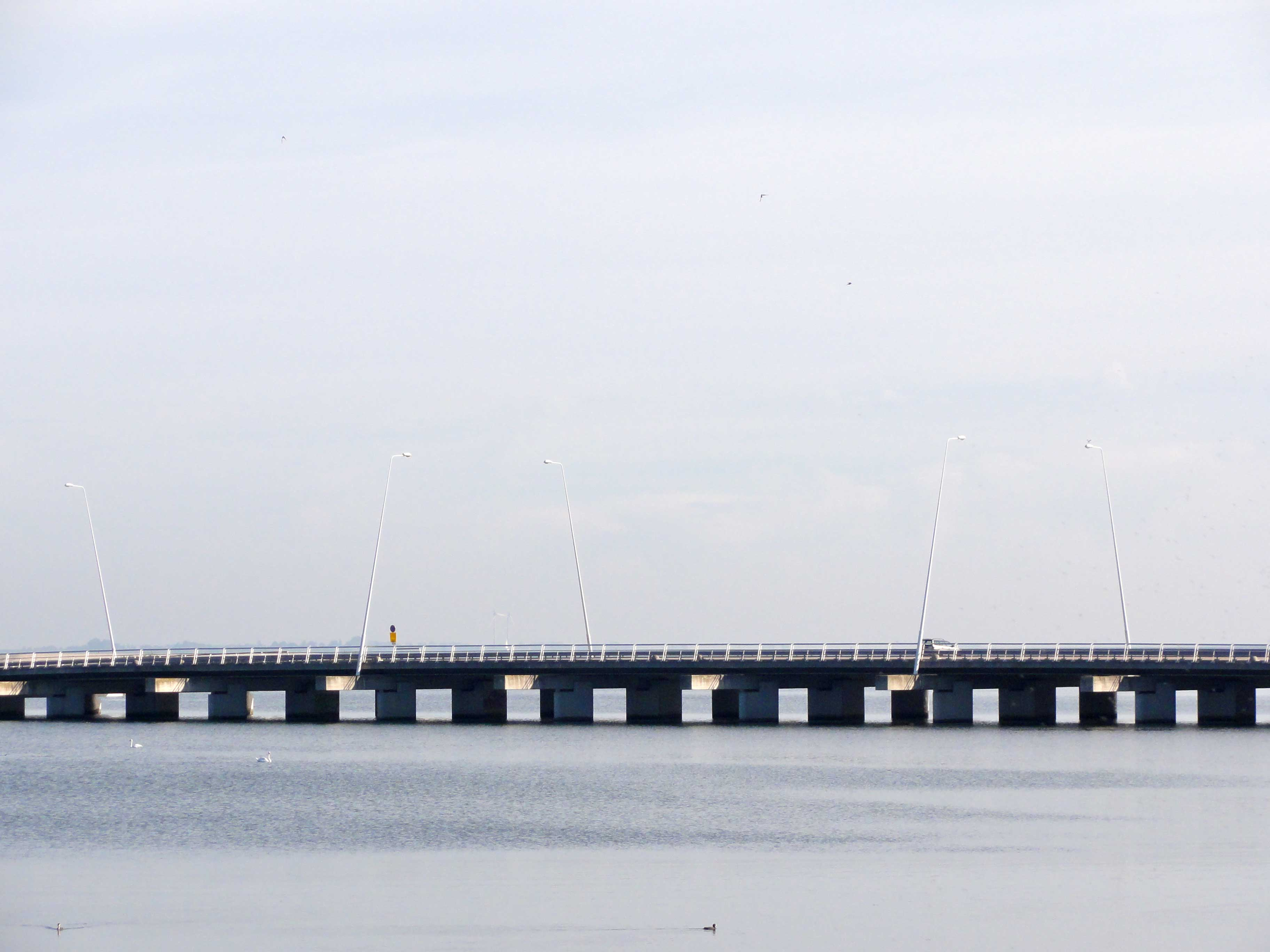
Premselabrug Amsterdam

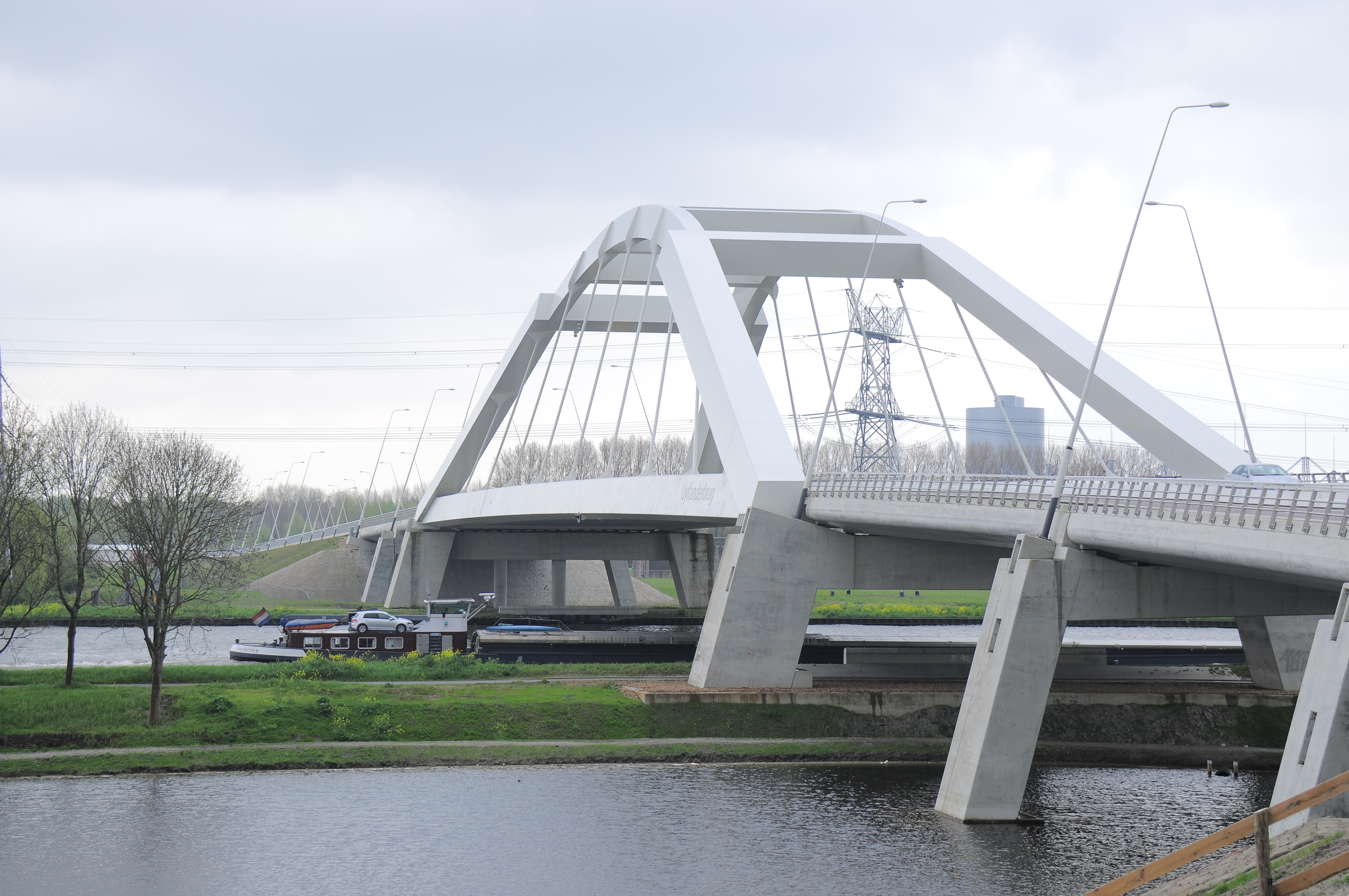
Uyllanderbrug Amsterdam
