= Jean-Thomas Thibault =

French painter

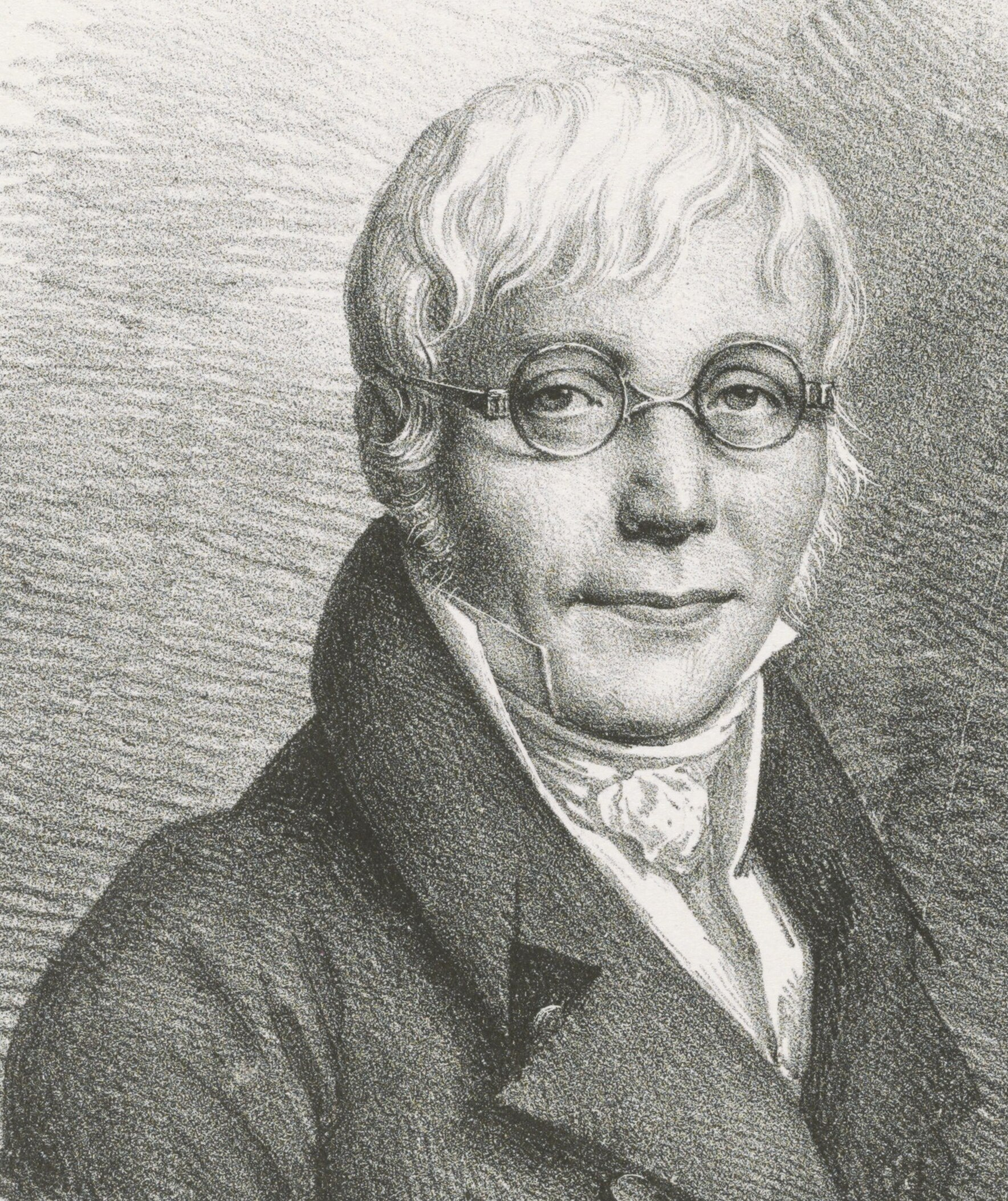
Jean-Thomas Thibault

Jean-Thomas Thibault (20 November 1757 – 27 June 1826) was a French painter and architect.

== Life ==
Born in Montier-en-Der, he studied at the École des beaux-arts de Paris in Étienne-Louis Boullée's studio from 1780 to 1786. He also studied under Pierre-Adrien Paris. He self-funded a trip to Rome between 1786 and 1790, where he befriended Charles Percier and Pierre-François-Léonard Fontaine.

During the First French Empire he was commissioned to restore the Hague Palace and Amsterdam's town hall. He died in Paris.

== Bibliography ==
- Jean-Philippe Garric, Recueils d’Italie : les modèles italiens dans les livres d’architecture français, Mardaga Éditions (ISBN 978-2870098776).
- Jean Coural, Le Palais de l’Élysée, Action artistique de la ville de Paris (ISBN 978-2905118752).
