= Flemish Government Architect =

The role of Flemish Government Architect (Vlaams Bouwmeester in Dutch) was established in 1998 under Minister-President of Flanders Van den Brande to develop Architectural Design Policy in Flanders, Belgium.

== Function ==
The Flemish Government Architect is commissioned to develop a long-term spatial vision, in consultation with the different administrations and with external stakeholders, to contribute to the preparation and implementation of the architecture policy of the Flemish government. The goal of this independent body in the government is to help create a high quality architectural living environment in Flanders, which was inspired by the Chief Government Architect of the Netherlands.

One of the main tasks of the Flemish Government Architect is selecting designers for public contracts. The Open Call is a list of public projects published twice per year to which designers can apply.

== Overview of Flemish Government Architects ==
2020-present Erik Wieërs
2016 - 2020 Leo Van Broeck
2015 - 2016 (acting) Stefan Devoldere
2010 - 2015 Peter Swinnen
2005 - 2010 Marcel Smets
1999 - 2005 Bob Van Reeth

== Awards ==
Prijs Wivina Demeester (previous: Prijs Bouwheer / Prijs Bouwmeester)

editie	jury	laureaten
2016	president: Oana Bogdan; Thérèse Legierse; Marc Martens; Philippe Van Wesenbeeck	Architecture: Stad Diksmuide - renovation of the town hall and the tourist office; Architecture: Province of West Flanders - Zwin Natural Park; Commissioned Art Work ('Kunst in Opdracht'): Avelgem - artistic transformation of the church of Bossuit
