= Bob Van Reeth =

Belgian architect (1943–2025)

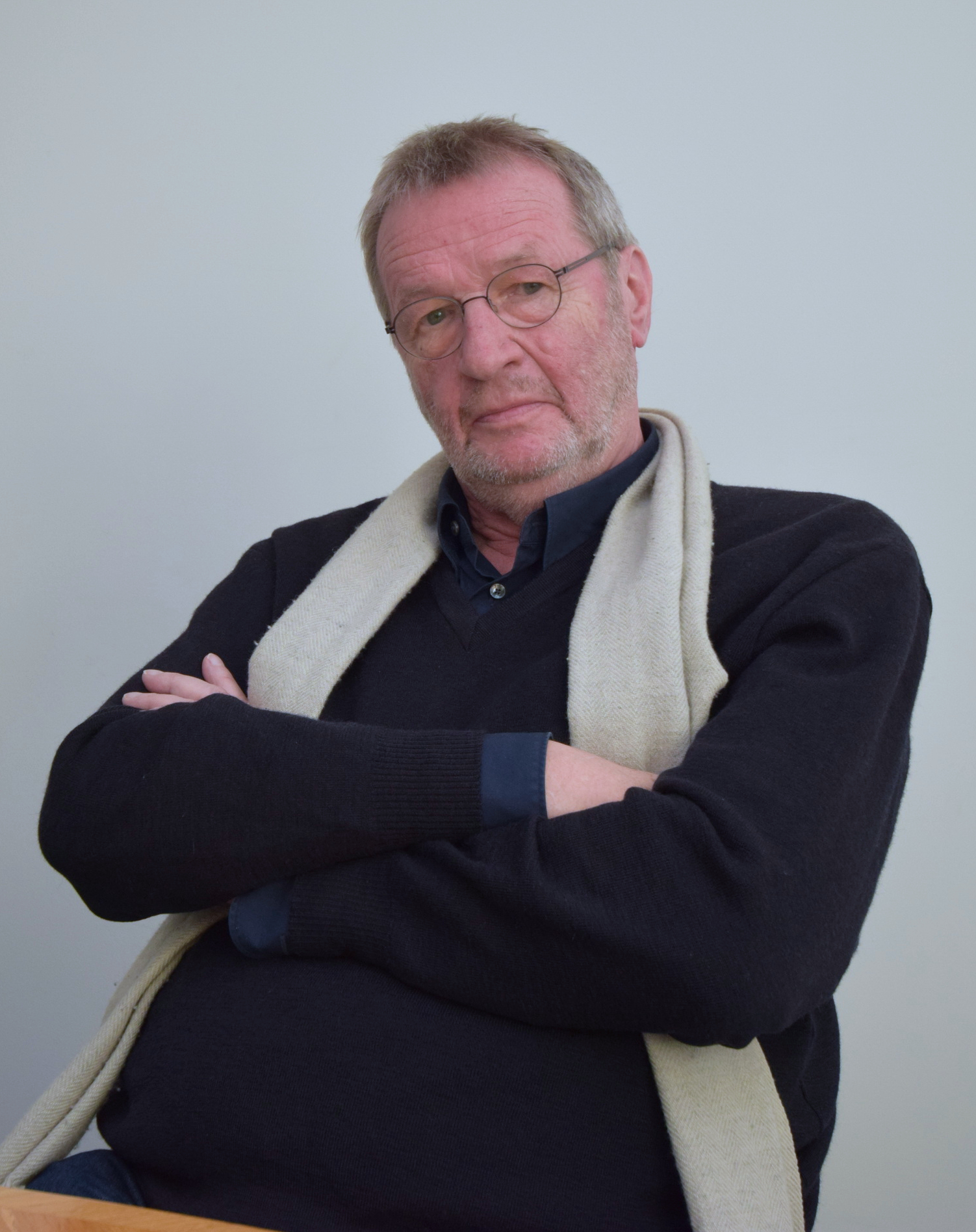
- Born: 26 February 1943; Temse, German-occupied Belgium
- Died: 30 September 2025 (aged 82)
- Occupation: Architect

Bob Van Reeth (26 February 1943 – 30 September 2025), who usually signed as bOb Van Reeth, was a Belgian architect.

== Life and career ==
Bob Van Reeth started working as an architect in 1965 with designing buildings in Mechelen and Kalmthout. In 1972, he became a teacher at the Nationaal Hoger Instituut voor Bouwkunst (The National Higher Institute for Architecture) in Antwerp. The same year, he started the group Krokus with Jean-Paul Laenen and Marcel Smets. The group worked on the restoration of the old centre of Mechelen.

In the 1980s, Van Reeth designed a new building for the Onze-Lieve-Vrouwecollege in Antwerp. Later buildings include in 2007 a new wing for the Westvleteren Abbey, and the black-and-white Huis Van Roosmalen facing the Scheldt in Antwerp. Close by stands the Zuiderterras, a grand café on the quay. He also led the company AWG (Architect Work Group) Architecten, which won the architectural concours for the design of a memorial and documentation centre about the Holocaust in Mechelen.

In January 1998, Van Reeth became the first Flemish Government Architect (Vlaams Bouwmeester), a function he held until 1 June 2005 when Marcel Smets succeeded him.

Van Reeth died on 30 September 2025, at the age of 82.
