= Xaveer De Geyter =

Belgian architect

Xaveer De Geyter (born 1957) is a Belgian architect.

De Geyter was born in Doornik, Belgium.

He spent ten years at office for metropolitan architecture with Rem Koolhaas, where he worked on projects such as the Villa dall'ava in Paris, "urban design, melun sénart paris", the sea terminal in Zeebrugge, the zkm centre for art & media technology in Karlsruhe and two libraries for Jussieu University, Paris.

De Geyter started his own firm in the early 1990s and built two private villas in Belgium.

Early designs such as the Ilot Saint Maurice in Lille and the Chassé Apartment towers, Breda, exemplify his capacity for innovative architectural design. In 2001, a second office opened in Ghent, in collaboration with Stéphane Beel.

== Recent projects ==
- Coovi, planning and building for Elishout Campus, 2003
- Monaco, extension of the city in the sea, 2002
- Ghent University, two buildings and facility, 2001
- Paju Book city, office building with photo studio, Seoul, Korea, 2001
- MAS Anvers, historical museum Antwerp, competition, 1999
- Ilôt Saint Maurice, urban study with a mixed-program housing-shop-offices in Euralille (Lille),
- Pont du Gard in Nîmes, tourist accommodation and public space organisation, collaboration with Maarten van Severen Design, 1999
- Chassée Park appartements, 5 housing towers with parking, Breda (Netherlands) 1996–2001
