= Jürg Conzett =

Swiss civil engineer

- Born: 28 September 1956 (age 69); Aarau, Aargau, Switzerland
- Education: École Polytechnique Fédérale de Lausanne; ETH Zurich
- Occupation: Civil engineer
- Known for: Designing bridges

Jürg Conzett (born 28 September 1956) is a Swiss civil engineer known for designing bridges. After studying at the ETH Zurich and working for architect Peter Zumthor, Conzett started his own civil engineering office in 1988. Perhaps his best known works are a series of three pedestrian bridges located on the Veia Traversina trail of the Viamala in Switzerland. Though many of Conzett's works are in Switzerland, he has designed bridges elsewhere.

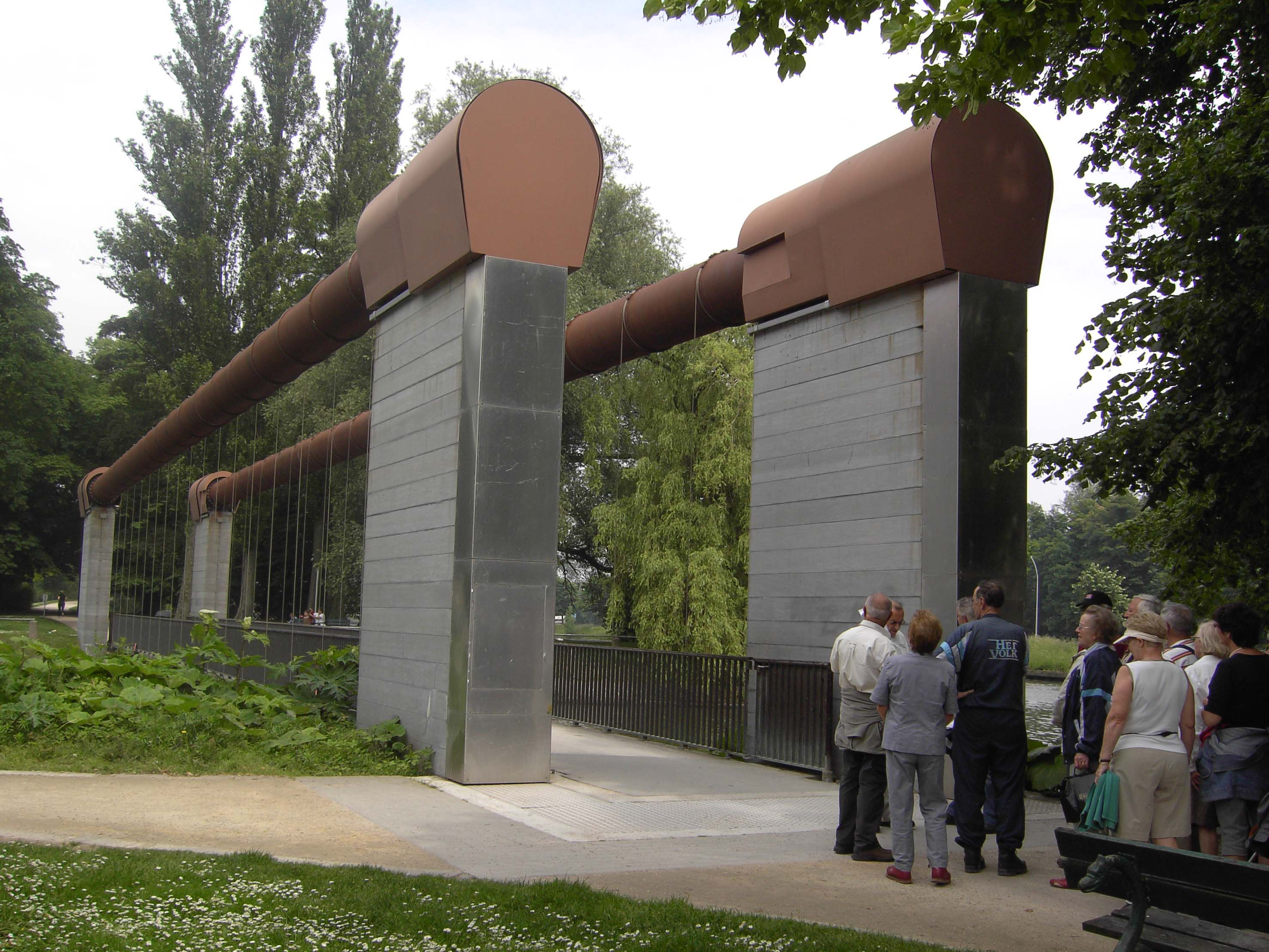
'Conzettbrug': pedestrian and cycle bridge over the Coupure canal in Bruges

== Biography ==
Jürg Conzett was born on 28 September 1956 in Aarau, Aargau, Switzerland. His father was a surveyor. Conzett cites Swiss cartographer Eduard Imhof as an early influence. He is also interested in and inspired by the Baroque, such as works by the Grubenmann brothers, 18th-century Swiss engineers.

In 1975 Conzett began studying civil engineering at the École Polytechnique Fédérale de Lausanne and ETH Zurich, gaining his diploma in 1980. From 1980 until 1987 he worked in the office of Swiss architect Peter Zumthor.

In 1988 Conzett started his own civil engineering office in Haldenstein. In 1992 the office became Branger & Conzett AG, and in 1996 Branger Conzett und Partner AG. In 1998 Conzett partnered with Gianfranco Bronzini and Patrick Gartmann to form Conzett Bronzini Gartmann AG in Chur. Gartmann left the firm in 2015, and its name changed to Conzett Bronzini Partner AG. Conzett is chairman of the board of directors and in charge of building and bridge construction projects at Conzett Bronzini Partner AG.

Between 1987 and 2004 he lectured on timber construction at the Fachhochschule Graubünden (Graubünden University of Applied Sciences). In 2015 he was a visiting professor at Harvard University Graduate School of Design.

== Works ==
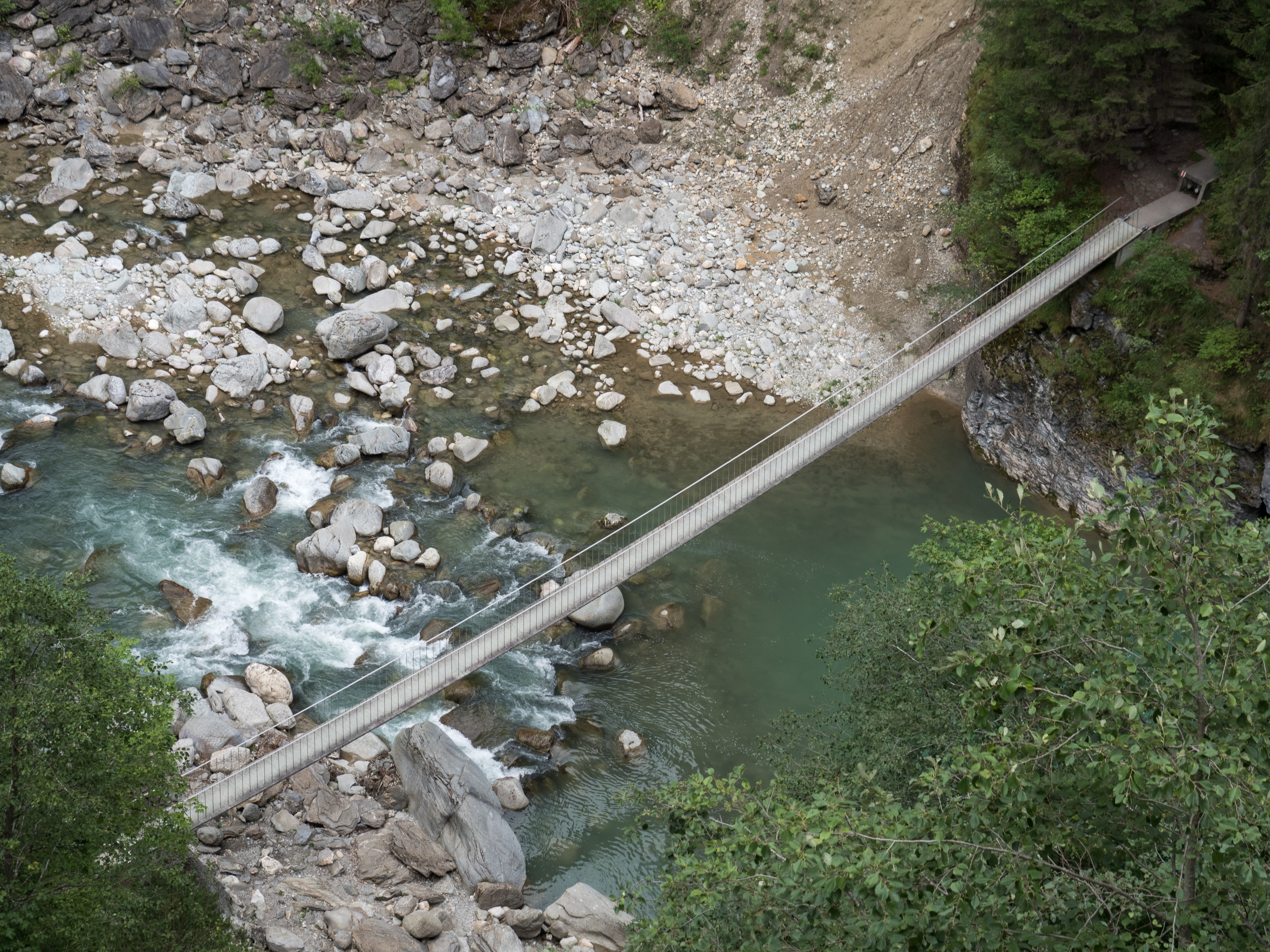
Conzett's post-tensioned stone bridge Punt da Suransuns, Switzerland

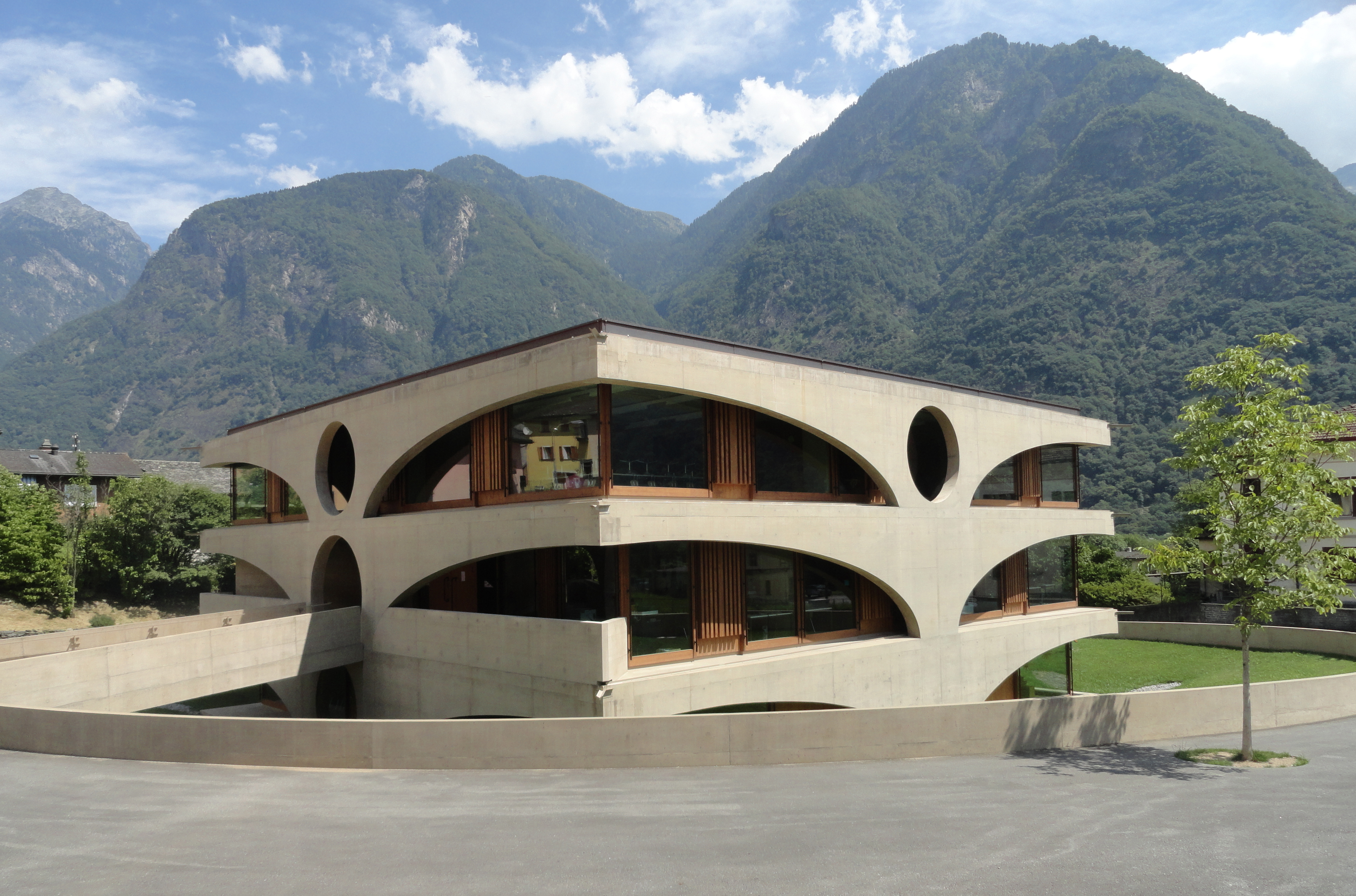
Schoolhouse Grono by Raphael Zuber

Perhaps Conzett's best known works are a series of three pedestrian bridges located on the Veia Traversina trail of the Viamala.

1. The first was a 47-metre (154 ft) wood-and-rope truss bridge known as the Traversinersteg I, completed in 1996 but destroyed in a March 1999 rockslide. The first Traversinersteg bridge was prefabricated as a single assembly and lifted into place by what was then Switzerland's most powerful helicopter.
2. The second bridge is Traversinersteg II, a wood and steel cable suspension bridge with large concrete abutments that spans 56 metres (184 ft) vertically and 96 metres (315 ft) horizontally—replaced the first in 2005.
3. The third is a 40-metre (130 ft) granite slab and steel cable stressed ribbon bridge called Pùnt da Suransans located near Thusis. Built in 1999, the Pùnt da Suransans crosses the Hinterrhein River in the shadow of the Great Viamala Bridge, a viaduct of the A13 motorway designed by Christian Menn. Punt da Suransuns is one of the first post-tensioned stone bridges ever constructed, and remains the second-longest serving tensioned stone bridge, after the Inachus footbridge.

With Peter Zumthor, the Vals-Platz Bridge (2009).

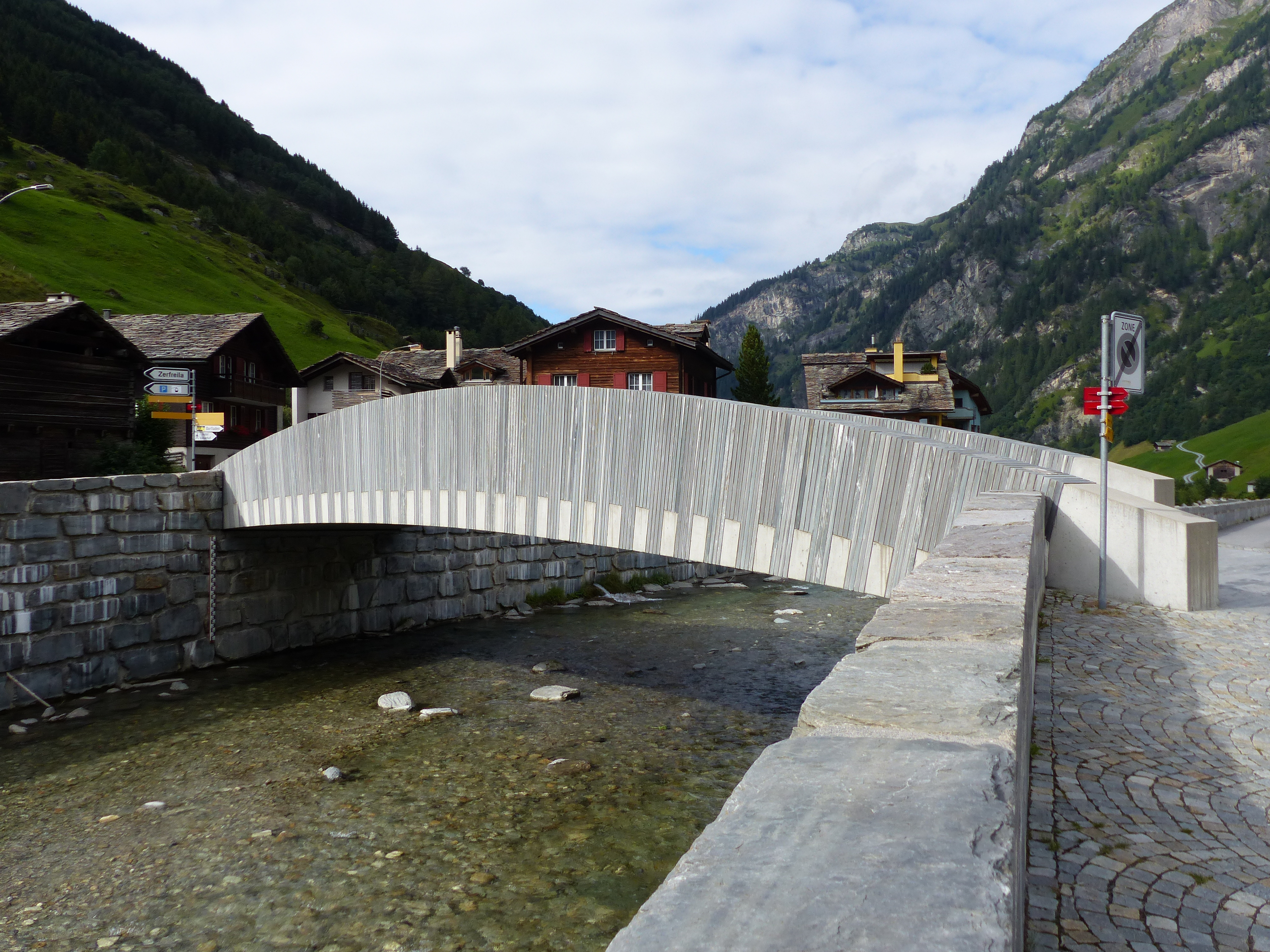
Vals neue Dorfbrücke, the new village bridge in Vals

Though many of Conzett's works are in Switzerland, he has designed bridges elsewhere. One such bridge— a pedestrian and cycle vertical-lift bridge spanning 36.5 metres (120 ft) over the Coupure canal in Bruges, Belgium, and built in 2002—was even named the Conzettbrug (Dutch: Conzett Bridge) in his honor. It collapsed in December 2023.

Conzett collaborates with architects and other building professionals on building projects. One such project is St Benedict's Chapel, Sumvitg, with his colleague Jürg Buchli, according to the design of architect Peter Zumthor. Another noteworthy project is the Mehrzweckhalle Vrin, a multipurpose hall built in Vrin in 1995 and designed in collaboration with architect Gion A. Caminada. Another is a school building in Grono designed with architect Raphael Zuber or the collaboration with the Austrian office Cukrowicz Nachbaur Architekten for a music center in Liechtenstein.

Images of selected works by Conzett
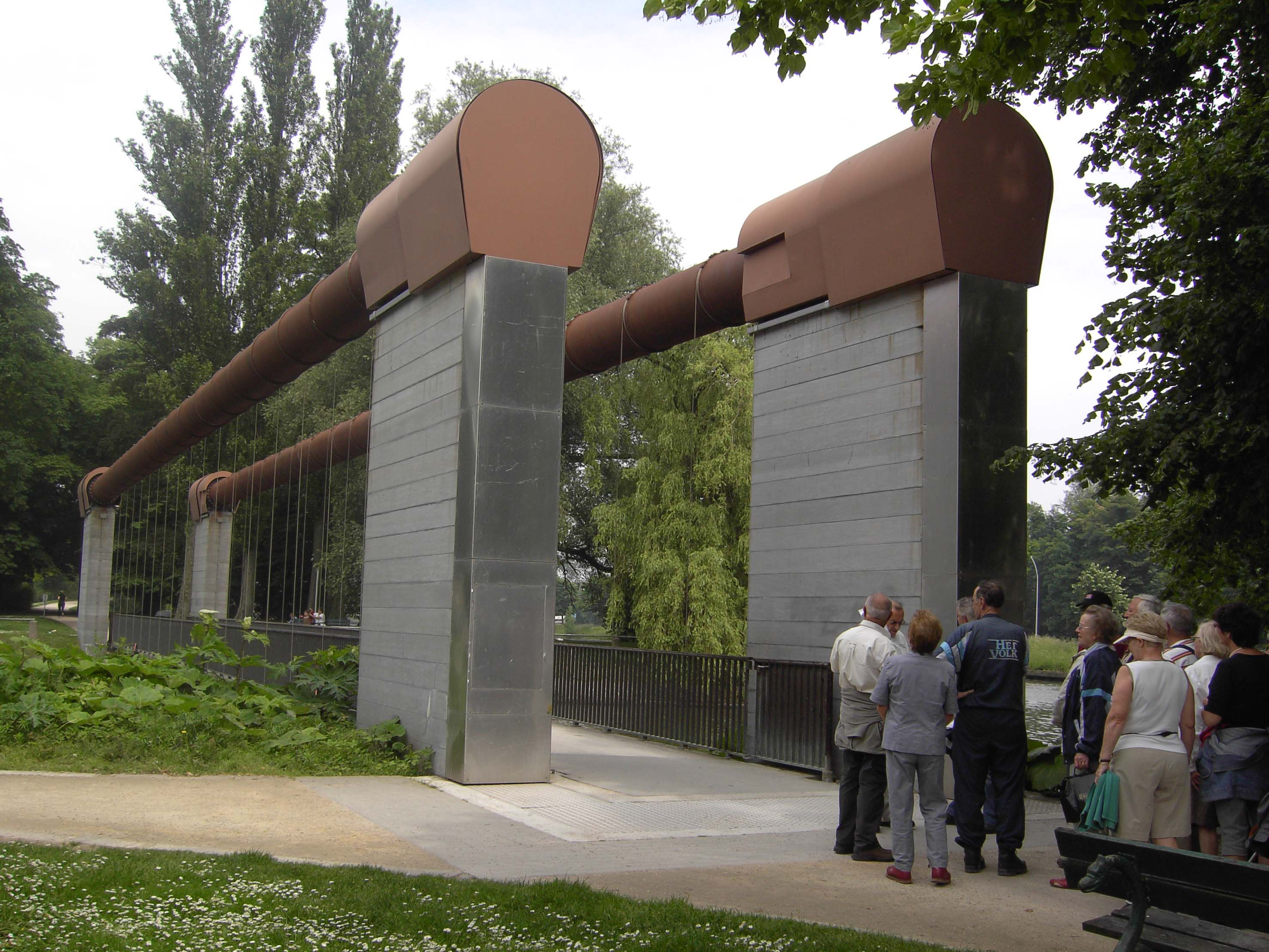
Conzettbrug: pedestrian and cycle bridge over the Coupure canal in Bruges (2002)

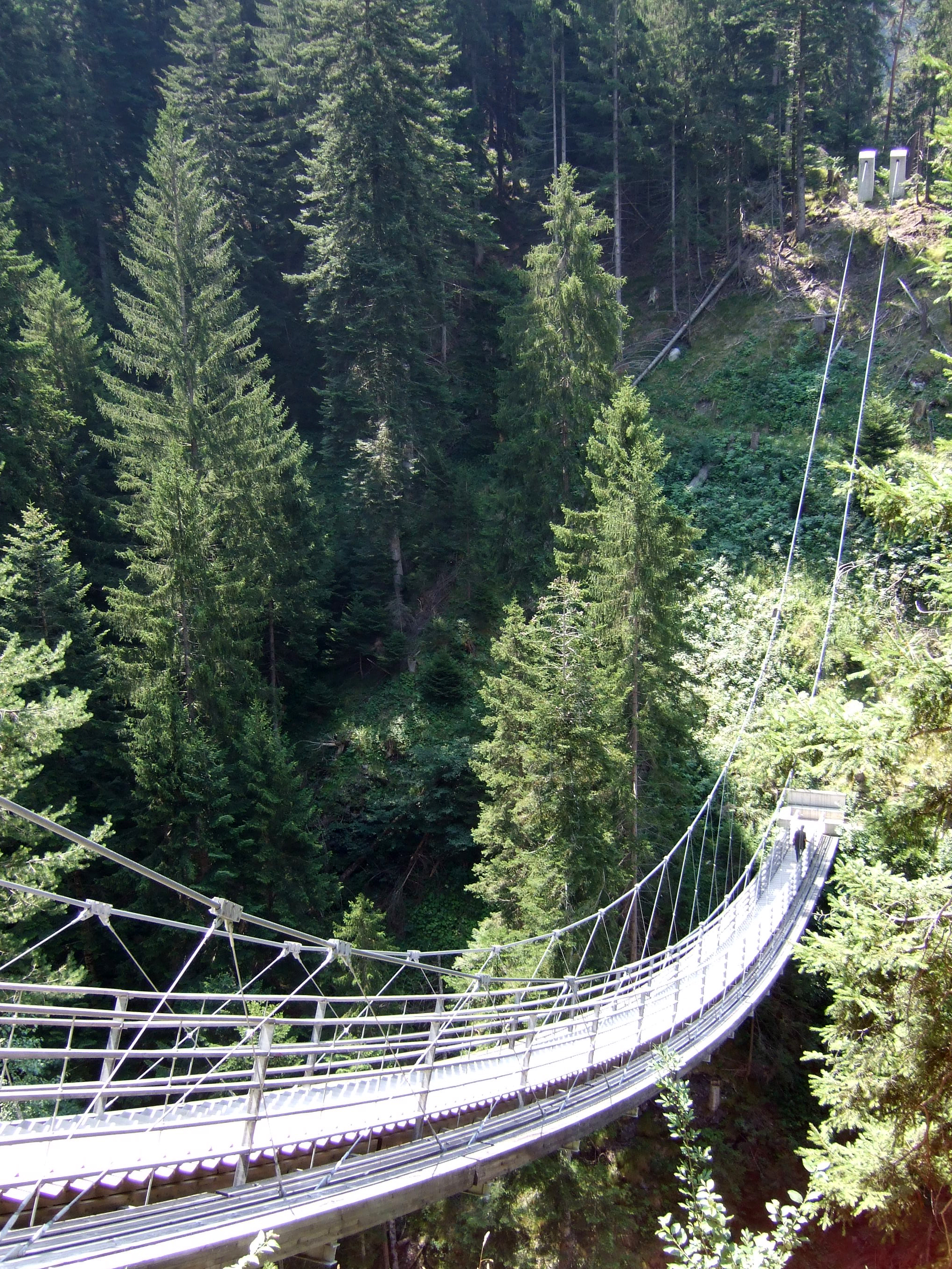
Traversinersteg II suspension bridge on the Viamala (2005)

== Design philosophy ==
In the interview for the Swiss Grand Award for Art - Prix Meret Oppenheim 2022, Conzett made the point that reinforced concrete was a great invention of the 20th century, and that "the principle of pre-tensioning can be applied to all materials."

“I always try to eke out a bit of freedom so that I can experiment with the opposite. That means exploring the poles of old–new, spectacular–unspectacular, and build–don't build.” Jürg Conzett

== Awards ==
- 2001: Auszeichnungen für gute Bauten Graubünden
- 2021: Auszeichnungen für gute Bauten Graubünden
- In 2022, Jürg Conzett, with longtime collaborator Gianfranco Bronzini were awarded the Swiss Grand Award for Art (Architecture) to recognize their body of work. The cited work included their design of many bridges, including tensioned stone footbridges.
- 2023: Prix Albert Caquot
