= Gion A. Caminada =

Swiss architect

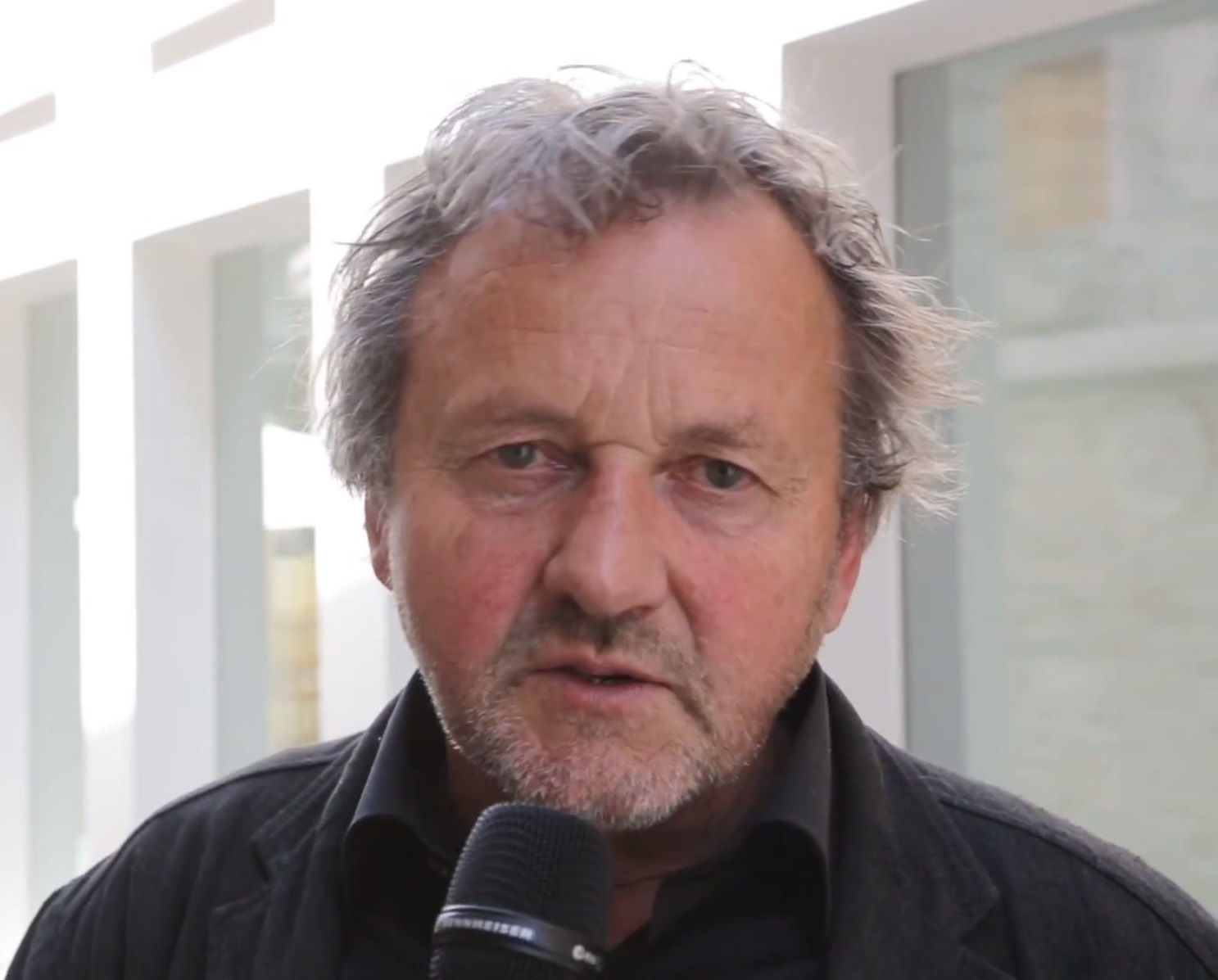
Caminada interviewed by Wohnblog TV in 2014

Gion Antoni Caminada (born 8 August 1957) is a Swiss architect and professor of architecture at the ETH Zurich. He is known for his works in and around the Swiss village of Vrin, including the Stiva da morts mortuary. Many of Caminada's projects are built of wood in a minimalist style mixing modern design with traditional Swiss methods and materials.

== Education and career ==
Caminada was born in Vrin, Graubünden, Switzerland. After apprenticing as a carpenter and cabinetmaker, Caminada attended the Kunstgewerbeschule Zürich (now part of the Zurich University of the Arts). He then completed a postgraduate degree in architecture at ETH Zurich, opening an architecture office in his home village of Vrin in the late 1970s. In 1998 he became an assistant professor of architecture at the ETH. In 2008 he was named an associate professor for architecture and design at the same institution. In 2020 he was made a full professor for architecture and design at the ETH.

== Works ==
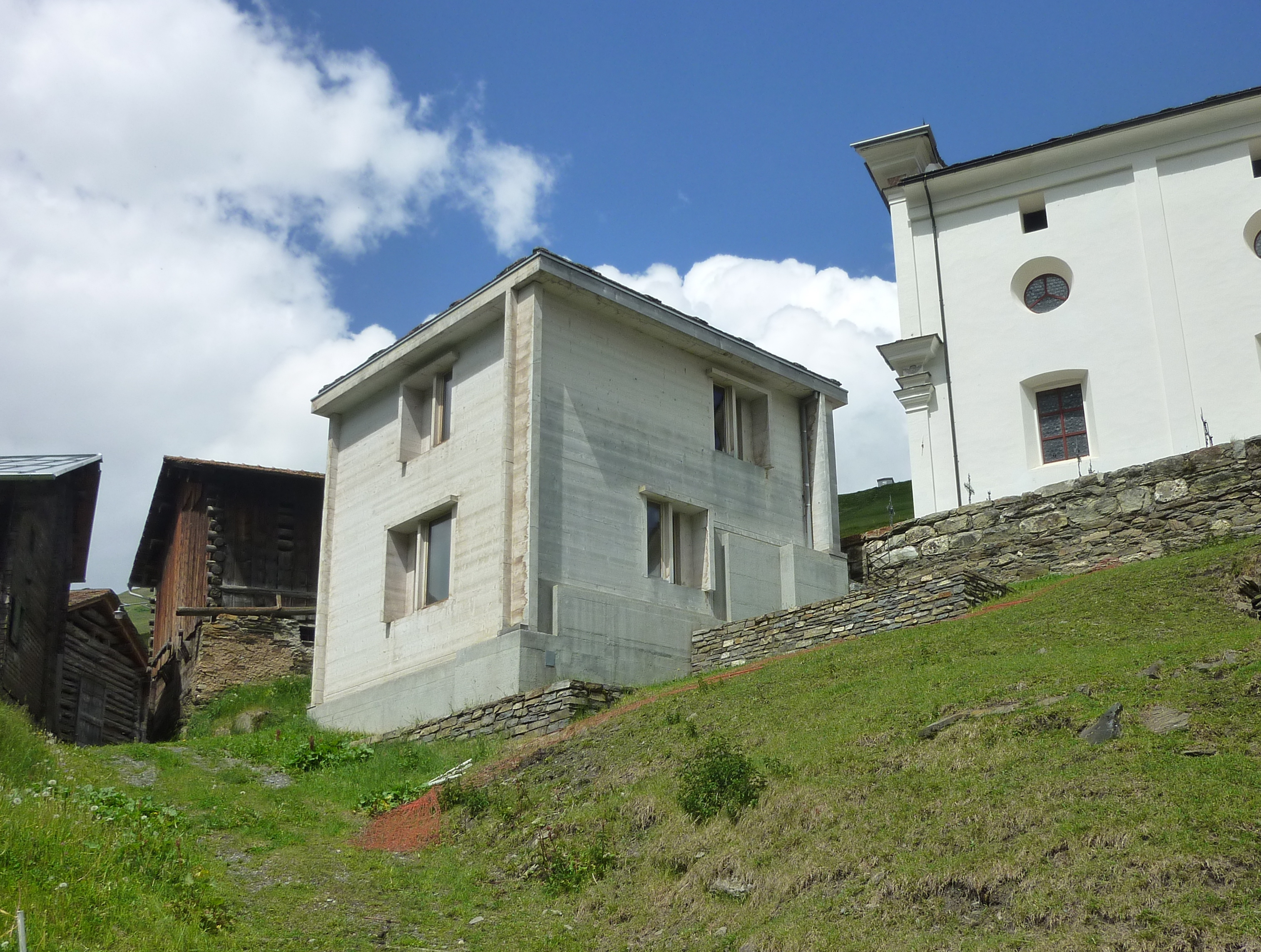
Stiva da morts in Vrin

Caminada is known for his works concentrated in and around Vrin. Perhaps his most well-known work is the Stiva da morts (Romansh: room of the dead) or Totenstube (German: room of the dead), a mortuary used for wakes and funerals designed and built adjacent to Vrin's church between 1996 and 2002. Another key work in Vrin is the Mehrzweckhalle Vrin, a multipurpose hall built in 1995 and designed in collaboration with civil engineer Jürg Conzett. Many of Caminada's projects are built of wood in a minimalist style mixing modern design with traditional Swiss methods and materials. In this way his work is comparable to that of Peter Zumthor, a fellow Swiss architect also hailing from Graubünden.

Caminada's other works include a house in Blatten bei Naters, a house in Degen, a girls' boarding school dormitory at Disentis Abbey and other projects in Disentis, a school in Duvin, renovating a guesthouse in Valendas, and a residential building in Siat, among many others.

In 2014 the House of Art in České Budějovice, Czech Republic, exhibited a collection of Caminada's works.

== Awards ==
- Auszeichnungen für gute Bauten Graubünden: 1994, 2013, 2017
- Eidgenössischer Preis für freie Kunst (now known as the Swiss Art Awards), 1996
- Deutscher Kritikerpreis, 2008
- Prix Meret Oppenheim, 2010
- Global Award for Sustainable Architecture, 2016
