= Nicolas Cilins =

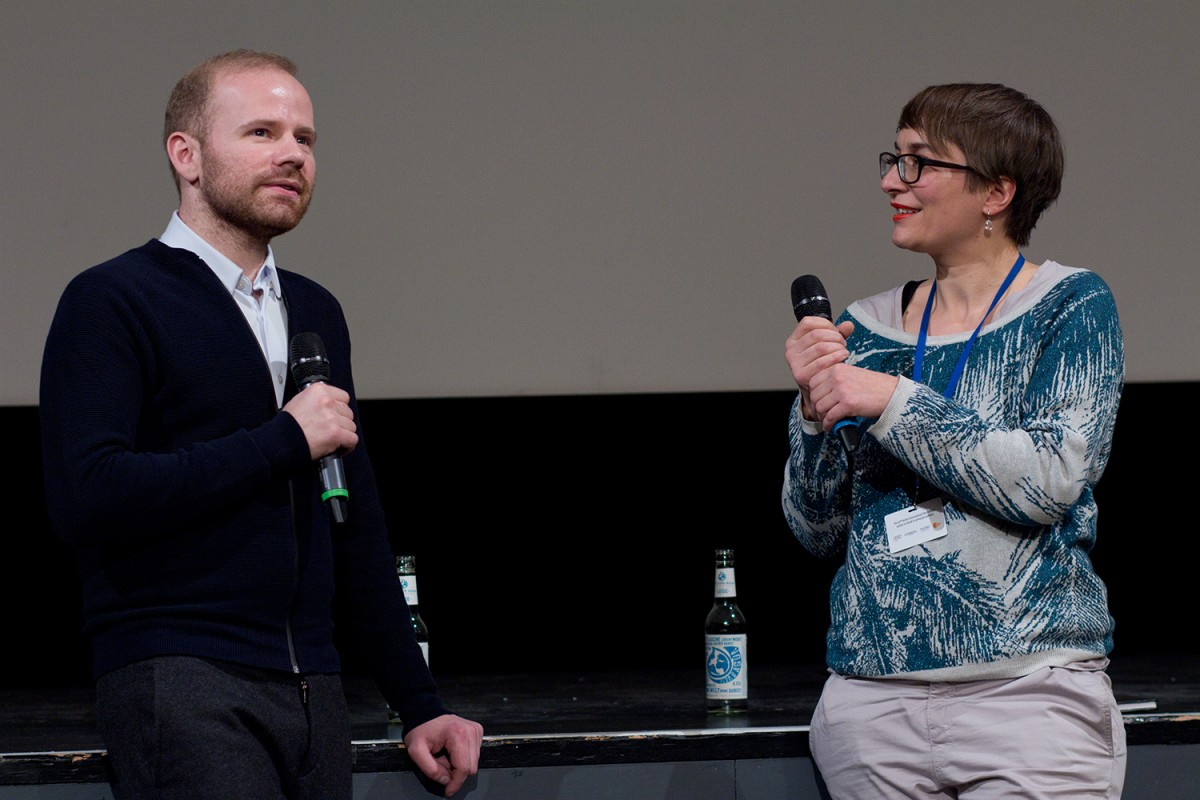
- Nicolas Cilins and Nanna Heidenreich during a Q&A at Berlinale 2015 (Forum Expanded section).
- Born: 1985 (age 39–40); Cannes, France
- Occupations: Artist and filmmaker
- Awards: Bourse de la Ville de Genève 2020, Swiss Art Awards 2018, Videokunst Förderpreis 2014, Kiefer Hablitzel Prize 2013
- Website: http://www.nicolas-cilins.com

Nicolas Cilins (born 1985, France.) is an artist living in Geneva, Switzerland, working across the disciplines of visual arts, filmmaking, and performance art. His works are included as part of several public collections, such as the Institut für Film und Videokunst in Germany, the Fonds régional d'art contemporain in France, the Kunstmuseum Bern, the Fonds cantonal d'art contemporain, and the Fonds municipal d'art contemporain de Genève in Switzerland. Cilins became a laureate of the Swiss Art Awards in June 2018, and a laureate of the Geneva Art Awards in September 2020.

== Education and career ==
Nicolas Cilins graduated with a Bachelor of Visual Arts from Villa Arson in 2007, before acquiring a diploma in performance art at the Haute École d'art et de design Genève (HEAD) in 2008. Cilins has long collaborated with French film editor Dominique Auvray and performance artist Yan Duyvendak. His work deals with cultural differences and social issues at the intersection of art, activism, and social change. He has also translated W. J. T. Mitchell’s seminal book, What Do Pictures Want?: The Lives and Loves of Images, into French.

== Selected works ==
Year	Title	Medium	Exhibition Listing
2021	Diva	Film	Berlinale, 2022
2021	Talk to Me!	Digital Durational Performance	Swiss Art Awards, 2021
2021	Conquest	Performance	Moscow Planetarium, Moscow, Russia, 2020
2020	The Way We Walk	Video Installation	La Rada, Locarno Switzerland, 2020
2020	The Rocket Ladies	Sound Installation	Bourse de la Ville de Genève, 2020
2018	Marabout	Video Installation	Swiss Art Awards, 2018
2017	Simulation	Performance	Performancepreis Schweiz, Gessnerallee, Zürich, Switzerland, 2017
2017	Bricofutur	Film	Les États Généraux du Documentaire, Lussas, 2017
2016	ACTIONS	Performance	Palais de la Porte Dorée, Musée de l'Histoire de l'Immigration, Paris, France, 2017 Festival International des Arts de Bordeaux, France, 2017 La Bâtie-Festival de Genève, Switzerland, 2017 Inteatro Festival, Italy, 2017
2015	Gineva	Film	Berlinale, 2015 MacVal, Paris, France, 2015
2013	Discipline & Punish	Installation	Centre d'Art Contemporain Genève, Genève, Switzerland, 2013
2013	Stalin’s World	Film	Sélestat Biennial of Contemporary Art, 2013 Kunstmuseum, Bern, Switzerland, 2017
2013	Waiting for the Barbarians	Installation	Musée des Civilisations de l'Europe et de la Méditerranée, Marseille, France, 2016 Musée d’Art et d’Histoire de Genève, Switzerland, 2015
2011	Moroccan Archaeologies	Film	Festival International de Cinéma - Marseille, 2012
