= Carlsberg Architectural Prize =

- Native name: Carlsberg Arkitekturpris
- Description: Architecture award recognizing excellence in lasting architectural design
- Country: Denmark
- Presented by: New Carlsberg Foundation

Carlsberg Architectural Prize (Danish: Carlsberg Arkitekturpris) was an architecture award founded by the Danish New Carlsberg foundation in 1991. It was awarded three times between the years 1992–1998 “To recognize excellence in lasting architectural design”. Her Majesty The Queen of Denmark acted as the patron of the prize. At the time of its foundation in 1991 the prize, being worth $235,000 was the biggest in the field of architecture. The first recipient, Tadao Ando, donated the prize money for the Osaka Prefectural Government, later used to establish the Ando Fund administered by the Osaka Foundation of International Exchange.

== Laureates ==
- 1992 - Tadao Ando
- 1995 - Juha Leiviskä
- 1998 - Peter Zumthor
