= 7132 Thermal Baths =

Hotel and spa in Vals, Switzerland

Coordinates: 46.622°N 9.181°E

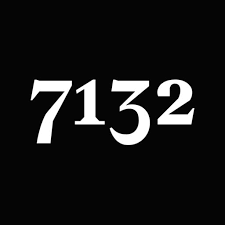
- Logo of 7132

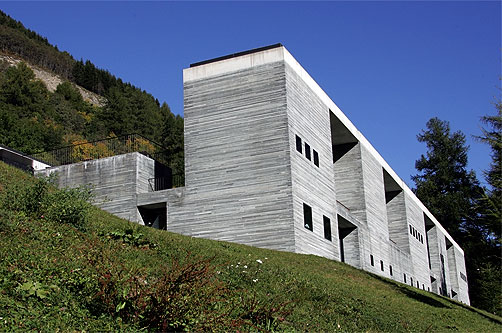
- Main building of the Thermal Baths
- Founded: 1996
- Headquarters: Switzerland
- Owner: Remo Stoffel
- Website: 7132.com

7132 Thermal Baths (formerly Therme Vals) is a hotel/spa complex in Vals, built over the only thermal springs in the Graubünden canton in Switzerland. Completed in 1996, the spa was designed by Peter Zumthor (Pritzker 2009).

== History ==
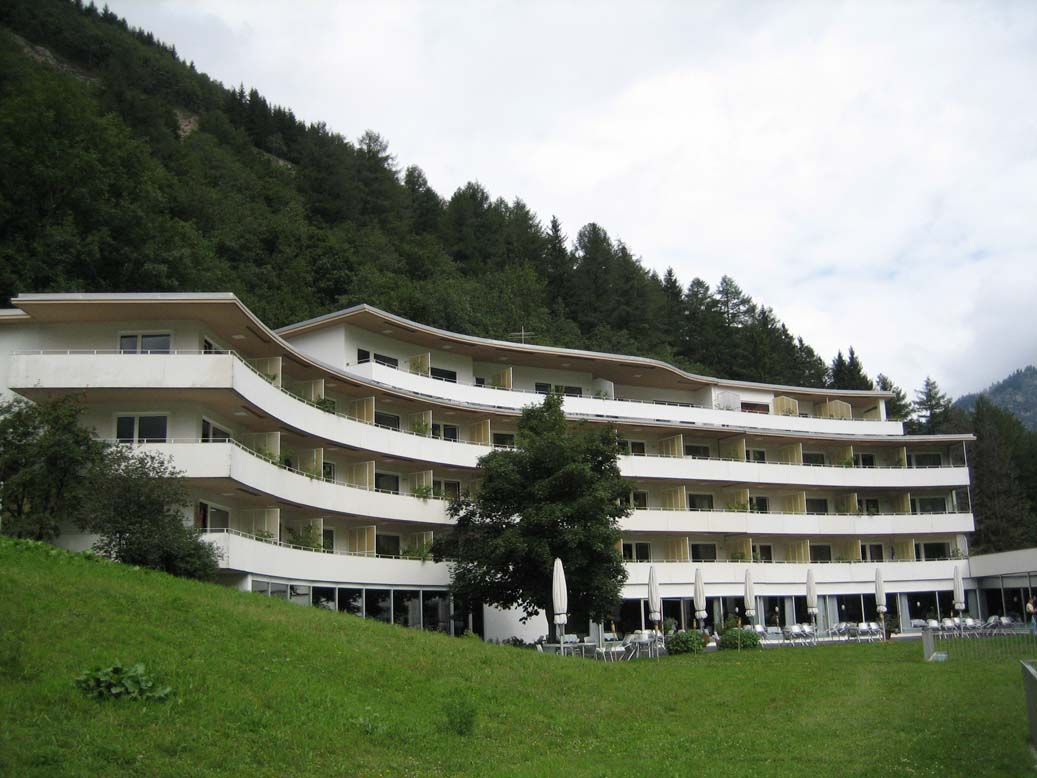
Hotel complex from the 1960s.

In the 1960s a German property developer, Karl Kurt Vorlop, built a hotel complex with over 1,000 beds to take advantage of the naturally occurring thermal springs and the source, which provides the water for Valser mineral water, sold in Switzerland. After the developer went bankrupt, the village of Vals bought the five hotels in development in 1983 and commissioned a hydrotherapy centre at the middle of the five hotels on the source of the thermal springs. The spa facility was built between 1993 and 1996, designed by Peter Zumthor.

In 2012, the hotel and spa, previously owned by the Vals community, was sold to the investor Remo Stoffel for CHF 7.8 million. Stoffel renamed the thermal site 7132 Therme & Hotel. Stoffel turned the spa into a luxury resort and made its access exclusive to the clients of his next-door hotel. In 2015, the architect Thom Mayne proposed a skyscraping tower project right next to the Baths. The project sparked controversy in the field of architecture.

In 2017, Peter Zumthor complained that Stoffel was killing the social project of the Therme initially designed for the local community.

== Architecture ==
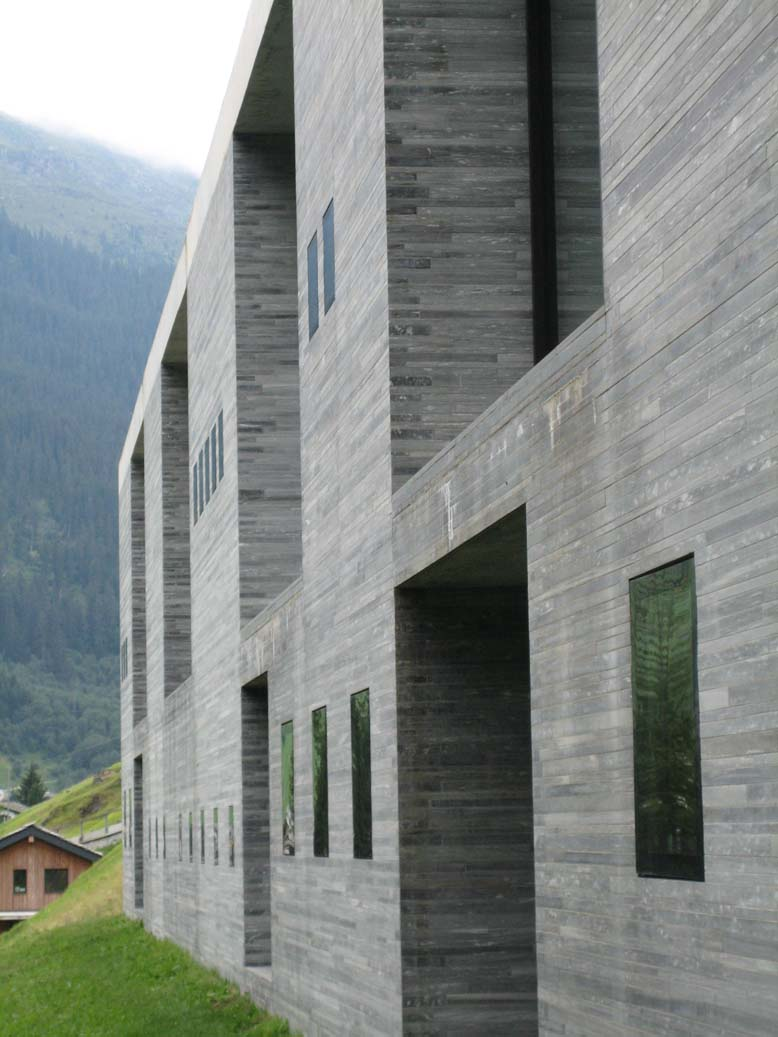
Detail of masonry, and exterior wall.

=== Spa ===
Peter Zumthor was selected as the architect for the spa. The concept of the building is based on an architectural interpretation of a stone quarry. Very characteristic for the movement in the building is constant change between the very small intimate spaces and the large meandering bath.

Built using locally quarried Valser quartzite slabs, the spa building is made up of 15 different table-like units, 5 metres in height, with cantilevered concrete roof units supported by tie-beams. These units fit together like a giant jigsaw puzzle. The nature of the construction is revealed through close inspection of the roof – the roofs of the units don't join, with the 8 cm gaps covered by glass to prevent water ingress. Inside, this provides a dichotomy – the concrete makes the roof appear heavy, but the gaps between the units also make the roof appear to float.

The baths were designed to look as if they pre-dated the hotel complex, as if they were a form of cave or quarry-like structure. This is particularly evident from observing the grass roof structure of the baths, which resemble the foundations of an archaeological site, and reveal the form of the various bath rooms which lie below, half buried into the hill-side.

There are 60,000 one-meter-long sections of stone forming the cladding of the walls. They appear random like an ashlar wall but there is a regular order. The cladding stones are of three different heights, but the total of the three is always 15 cm, so it allows for variety in arrangement, whilst facilitating construction.

=== Hotels ===
In 2016, Thom Mayne redesigned the hotel's entrance. Kengo Kuma designed the top-floor suites and Tadao Ando also worked on the project.

== Trivia ==
- The music video for the song "Every Time" by American singer Janet Jackson from her album, The Velvet Rope (1997), was filmed in the then-new Therme Vals.
- The novel "Tout ce qui remue et qui vit" (2013) by Swiss Writer Isaac Pante takes place in the Therme Vals.
- French photographer Dominique Issermann spent three days with French model and actress Laetitia Casta. The result of this photoshoot is available in a book published by Éditions Xavier Barral.

The 2017 French graphic novel "Swimming in Darkness" by Lucas Harari has the Therme Vals as its setting. The story follows Pierre, who dropped out from architecture school and travels to Switzerland to visit the famous thermal baths buildings, designed by Swiss architect Peter Zumthor. While there he becomes acquainted with the mysterious Monsieur Valeret, who is similarly obsessed with the thermal complex built deep inside a mountain. The two become rivals.

The English language edition was printed in 2019 by Arsenal Pulp Press, a Vancouver, B.C. Canadian publisher. Translated by David Homel.

A Romansh language edition was printed in 2019 by Ediziun Apart.

== See also ==
- List of hotels in Switzerland
- Tourism in Switzerland
- World Architecture Survey
