= St Benedict's Chapel, Sumvitg =

Church in Sumvitg, Switzerland

Coordinates: 46.73478°N 8.93967°E

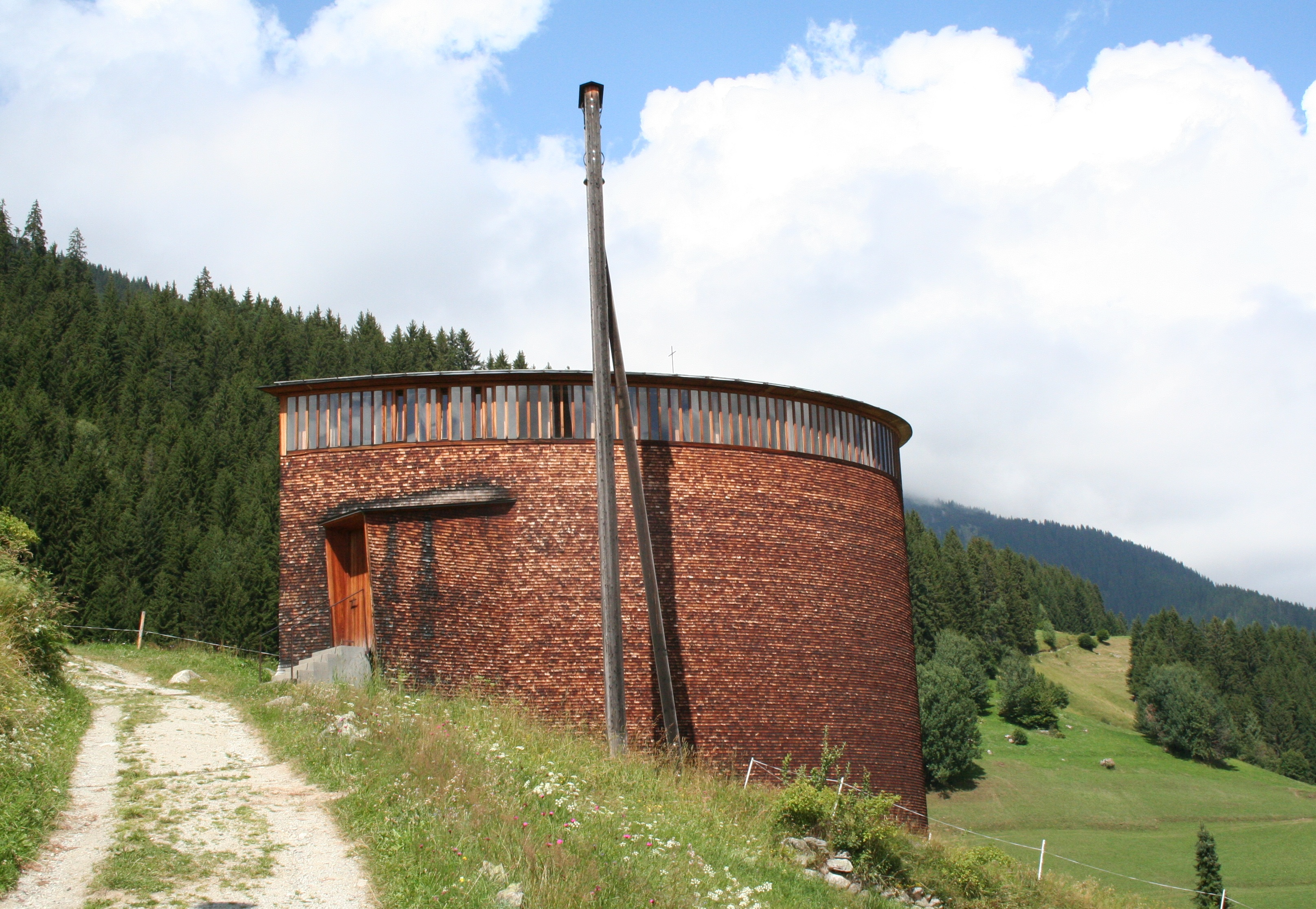
St Benedict's Chapel in Sumvitg.

The Chapel of Saint Benedict (Romansh: Caplutta Sogn Benedetg; German: Kapelle des Heiligen Benedikt) is a Roman Catholic church located in Sumvitg, Surselva Region, canton of Graubünden, Switzerland.

After a 1984 avalanche destroyed a Baroque chapel on the same site, the Disentis Abbey decided to build a new chapel. Architect Peter Zumthor won the architectural competition for the project. The new chapel was built between 1985 and 1989 for a total cost of CHF 600,000. Jürg Buchli and Jürg Conzett were the engineers.

== Awards ==
- 1992: Neues Bauen in den Alpen
- 1994: Auszeichnungen für gute Bauten Graubünden
