= Auszeichnungen für gute Bauten Graubünden =

Swiss architecture award

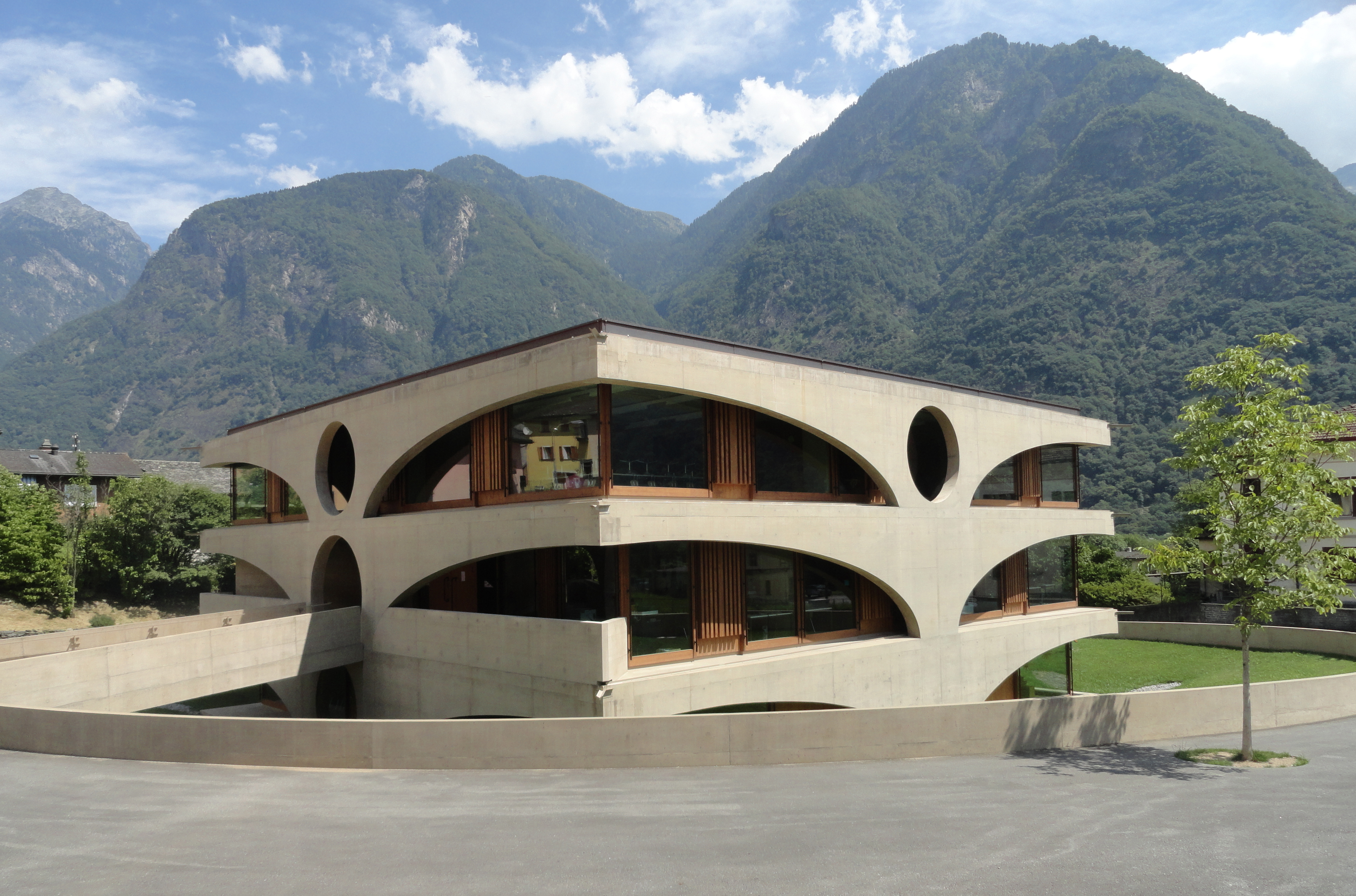
Schoolhouse Grono by Raphael Zuber

Auszeichnungen für gute Bauten Graubünden is a Swiss-based architecture prize that has been awarded by the Gute Bauten Graubünden (Award for Architectural Achievements) since 1987.

The award recognizes developers for their outstanding contributions to the building culture in the canton of Graubünden. These contributions serve as benchmarks for superior building quality. The intention of the award is to foster public interaction with architectural spaces and to highlight the significance of high-caliber building practices. The award aims to promote discussion about architecture and thereby create awareness for building culture.

New buildings from the fields of architecture and engineering, conversions, restorations, exterior design (squares, gardens, etc.) as well as implemented urban planning and approved spatial planning projects can be submitted for assessment.

== History ==
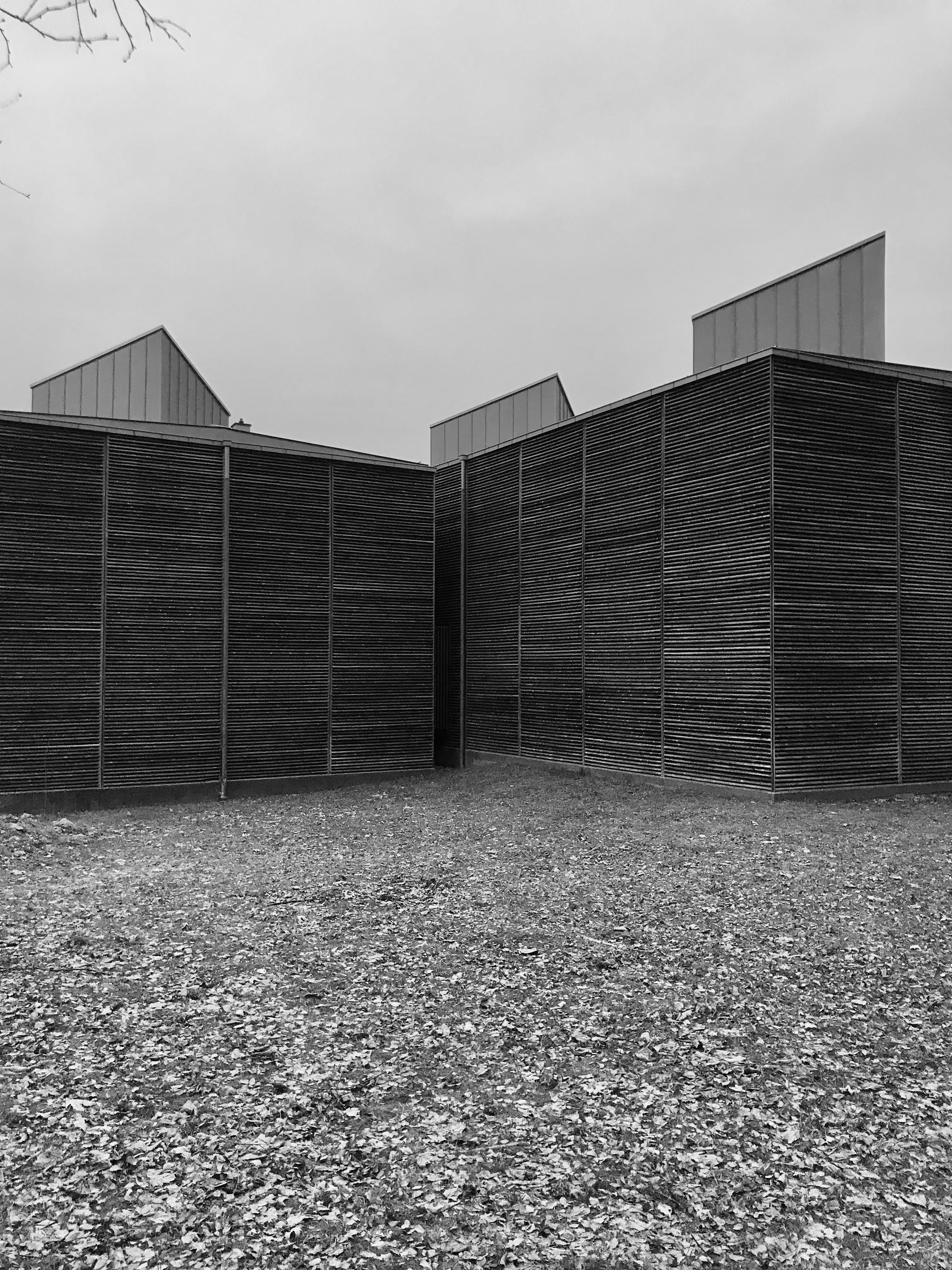
Schutzbauten Welschdörfli, Chur

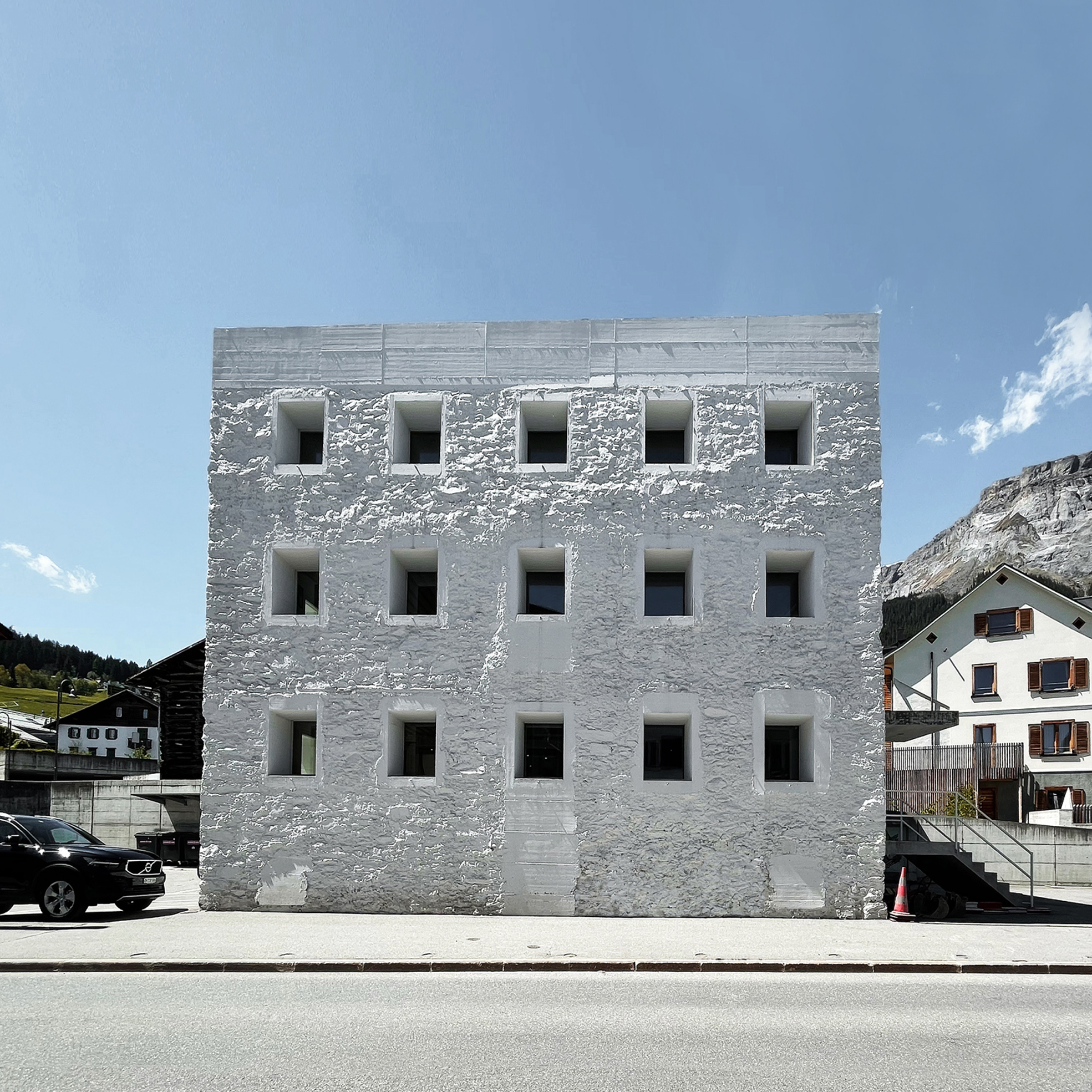
Gelbe Haus, Flims

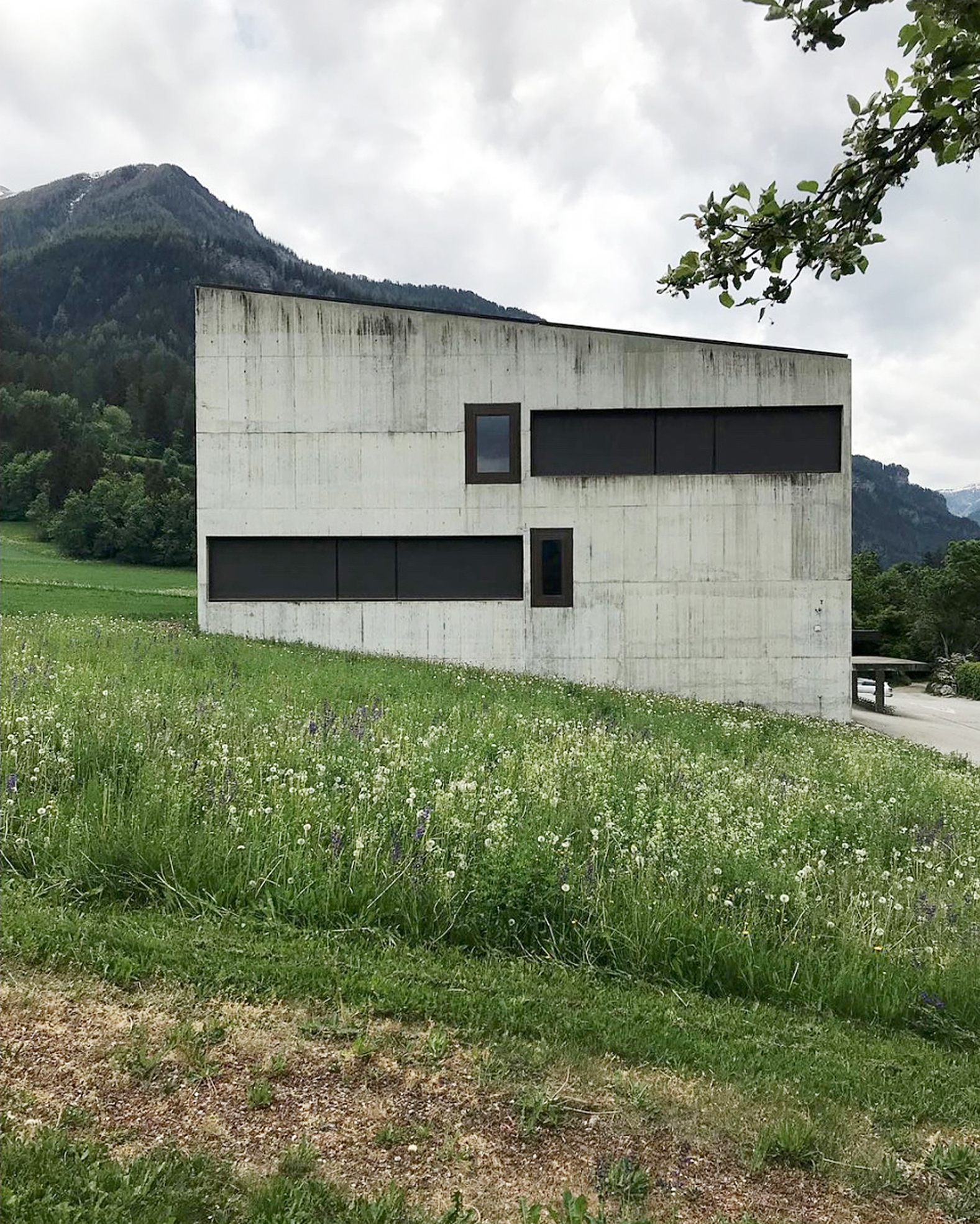
Schoolhouse Paspels, Paspels

The Gute Bauten Graubünden association is organized by the following associations: Federation of Swiss Architects, Bündner Heimatschutz, Bündner Association for Spatial Development, Heritage Protection Section Engadin and Southern Valleys, Institute for Building in the Alpine Region, Schweizerischer Werkbund and Swiss Association of Engineers and Architects.

== Judges ==
The selection committee for the Gute Bauten Graubünden award is made up of interdisciplinary members with four external experts from different areas of building culture and one politician. The jury selects a number that it deems appropriate from the submitted projects for the award.

=== 2021 ===
- Marina Hämmerle
- Meritxell Vaquer i Fernàndez
- Anna Giacometti
- Joseph Schwartz
- Lando Rossmaier

== Winners ==
=== 1987 ===
- Peter Zumthor
- Robert Obrist
- Max Kasper

=== 1994 ===
- Gigon/Guyer
- Gion A. Caminada
- Bearth & Deplazes
- Richard Brosi
- Peter Zumthor

=== 2001 ===
- Jürg Conzett
- Valerio Olgiati
- Gigon/Guyer
- Christian Menn
- Bearth & Deplazes

=== 2013 ===
- Raphael Zuber
- Gion A. Caminada
- Miller & Maranta
- Armando Ruinelli

=== 2017 ===
- Gion A. Caminada
- Peter Zumthor
- Bearth & Deplazes

=== 2021 ===
- Conzett Bronzini Partner
- Armando Ruinelli
- Bearth & Deplazes
- Marques Architekten AG
- Gion A. Caminada
