= Haldenstein =

- Former municipality
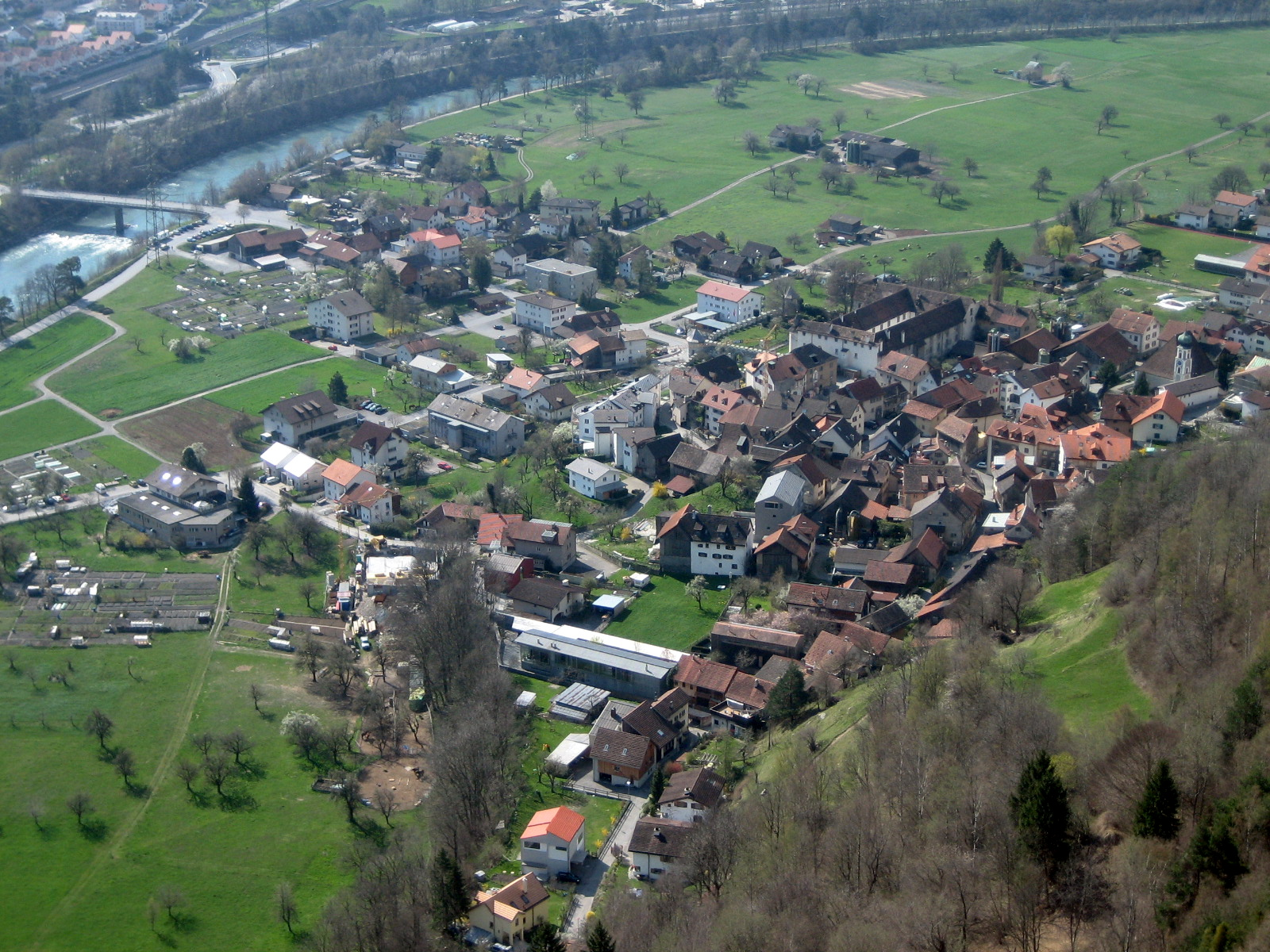

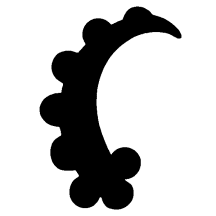
- Flag Coat of arms
- Location of Haldenstein
- Location within Switzerland Location within Canton of Grisons
- Coordinates: 46°53′N 9°32′E
- Country: Switzerland
- Canton: Grisons
- District: Plessur

Area
  - Total: 18.56 km^{2} (7.17 sq mi)
- Elevation: 528 m (1,732 ft)

Population (December 2019)
  - Total: 1,090
  - Density: 58.7/km^{2} (152/sq mi)
- Time zone: UTC+01:00 (CET)
  - Summer (DST): UTC+02:00 (CEST)
- Postal code: 7023
- SFOS number: 3941
- ISO 3166 code: CH-GR
- Surrounded by: Chur, Felsberg, Pfäfers (SG), Trimmis, Untervaz
- Website: www.haldenstein.ch

Haldenstein is a former municipality in the Plessur Region in the Swiss canton of Grisons. On 1 January 2021 the former municipality of Haldenstein merged into the municipality of Chur.

== History ==
Haldenstein is first mentioned in 1149 as Lanze. In 1370 it was mentioned as Lentz inferior.

== Geography ==
Aerial view (1957)

Haldenstein had an area, as of 2006, of 18.6 km^{2} (7.2 sq mi). Of this area, 25.6% is used for agricultural purposes, while 53.9% is forested. Of the rest of the land, 2.1% is settled (buildings or roads) and the remainder (18.4%) is non-productive (rivers, glaciers or mountains).

Before 2017, the municipality was located in the Fünf Dörfer sub-district of the Landquart district, after 2017 it was part of the Plessur Region. It is located north of Chur and on the left bank of the Rhine River. It consists of the haufendorf (an irregular, unplanned and quite closely packed village, built around a central square) village of Haldenstein (which is an elevation of 572 meters (1,877 ft)) and the hamlets of Batänja (formerly: Sewils) (which is at 1,400 meters (4,600 ft)) and Berg (which is at 1,505 meters (4,938 ft)). The municipality's boundaries are the Rhine and then up the Calanda mountain from the river to the border with the canton of St. Gallen.

== Demographics ==
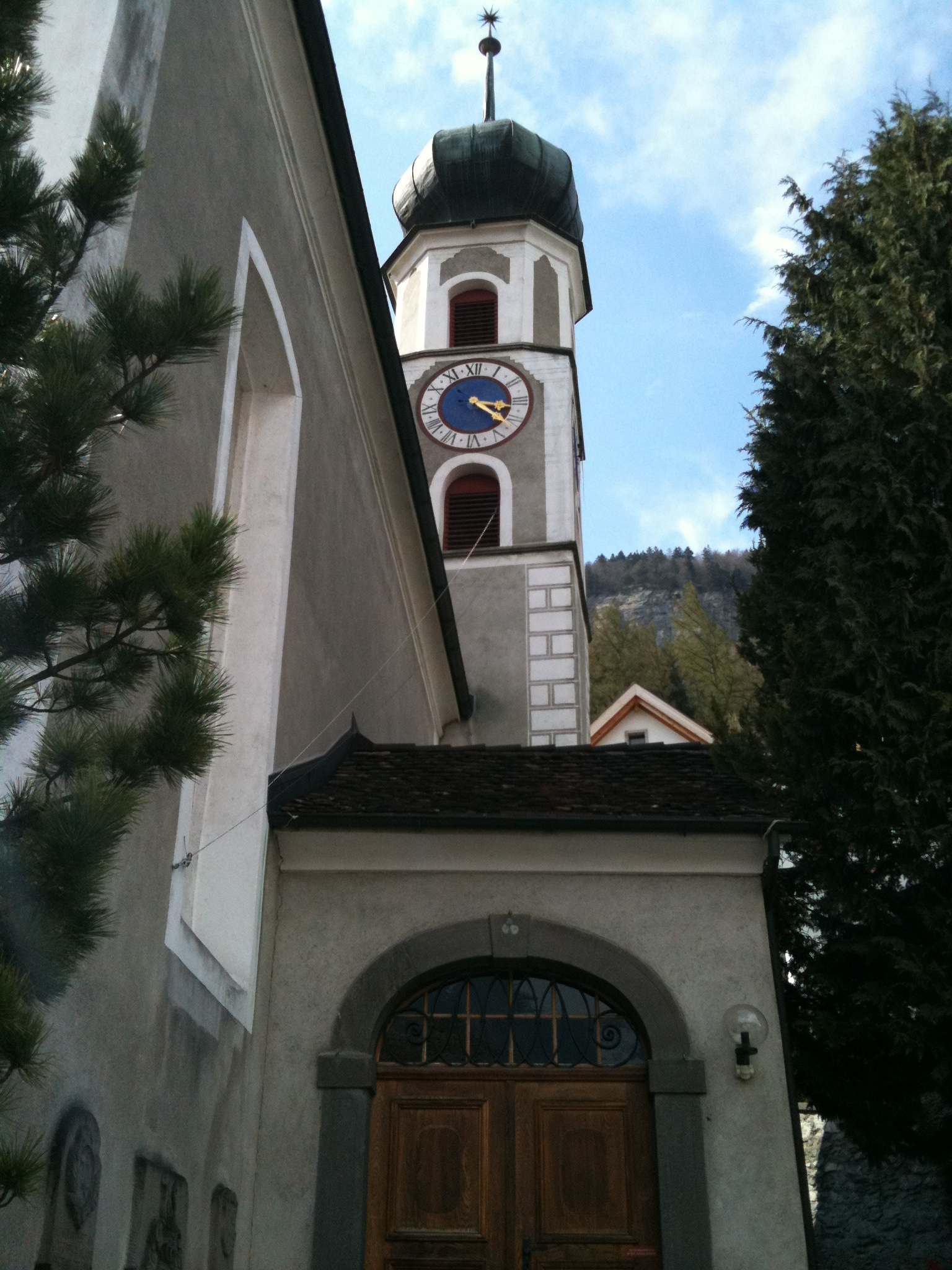
The Protestant church in Haldenstein

Haldenstein had a population (as of 2019) of 1,090. As of 2008, 9.9% of the population was made up of foreign nationals. Over the last 10 years the population has grown at a rate of 19.8%.

As of 2000, the gender distribution of the population was 49.6% male and 50.4% female. The age distribution, as of 2000, in Haldenstein is; 116 children or 14.4% of the population are between 0 and 9 years old. 47 teenagers or 5.8% are 10 to 14, and 49 teenagers or 6.1% are 15 to 19. Of the adult population, 93 people or 11.5% of the population are between 20 and 29 years old. 166 people or 20.5% are 30 to 39, 115 people or 14.2% are 40 to 49, and 108 people or 13.4% are 50 to 59. The senior population distribution is 59 people or 7.3% of the population are between 60 and 69 years old, 31 people or 3.8% are 70 to 79, there are 16 people or 2.0% who are 80 to 89, and there are 8 people or 1.0% who are 90 to 99.

In the 2007 federal election the most popular party was the SVP which received 40.1% of the vote. The next three most popular parties were the SPS (34.8%), the FDP (16.8%) and the CVP (7.1%).

In Haldenstein about 83.9% of the population (between age 25–64) have completed either non-mandatory upper secondary education or additional higher education (either university or a Fachhochschule).

Haldenstein has an unemployment rate of 0.9%. As of 2005, there were 24 people employed in the primary economic sector and about 9 businesses involved in this sector. 114 people are employed in the secondary sector and there are 13 businesses in this sector. 105 people are employed in the tertiary sector, with 20 businesses in this sector.

The historical population is given in the following table:

year	population
1803	349
1850	492
1900	464
1950	521
1990	677
2000	808

== Languages ==
Most of the population (as of 2000) speaks German (92.8%), with Italian being second most common (2.8%) and Romansh being third (2.0%).

== Heritage sites of national significance ==
The Ruins of Haldenstein fortress and Schloss Haldenstein are listed as Swiss heritage sites of national significance.

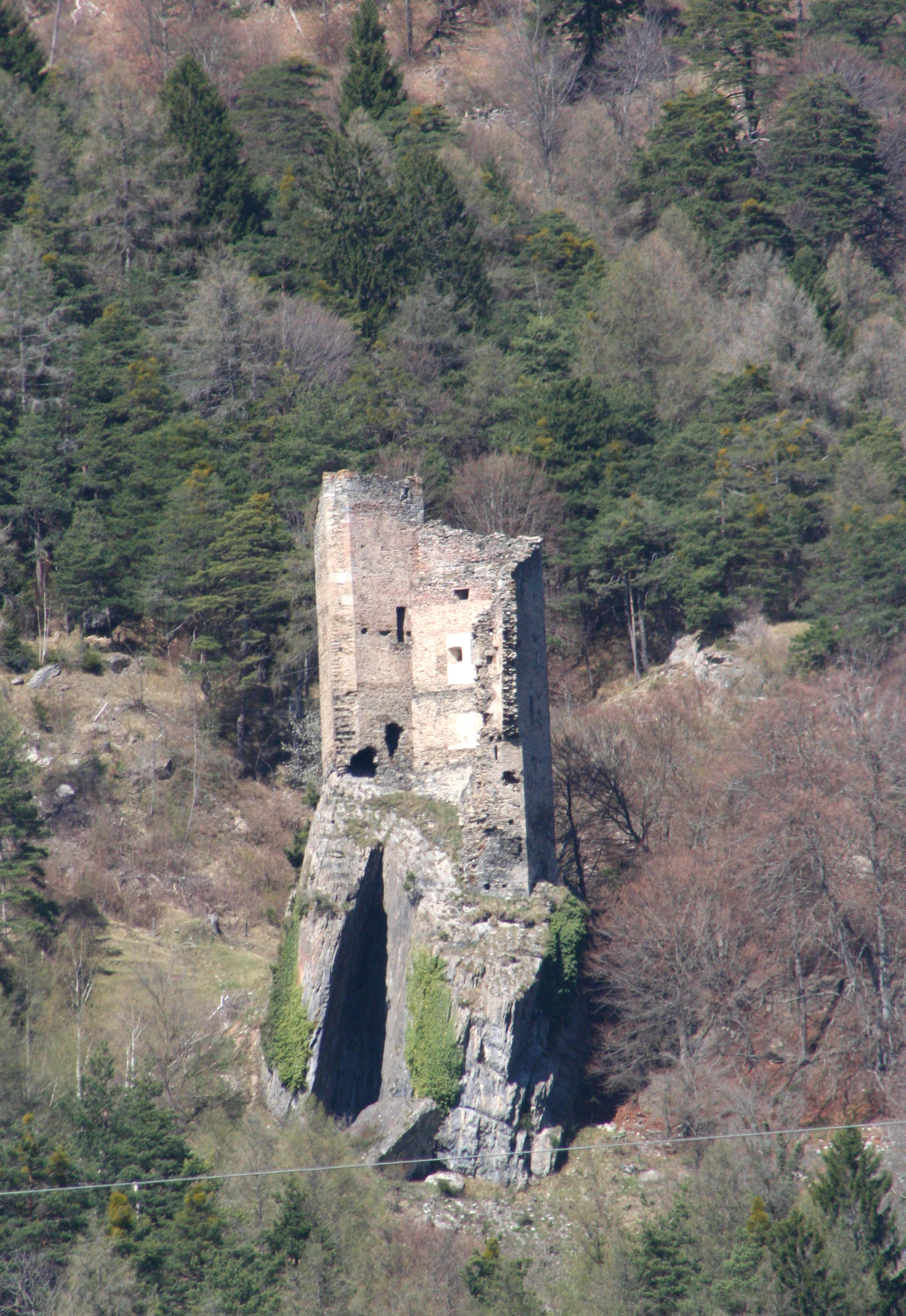
Burg Haldenstein (fortress)

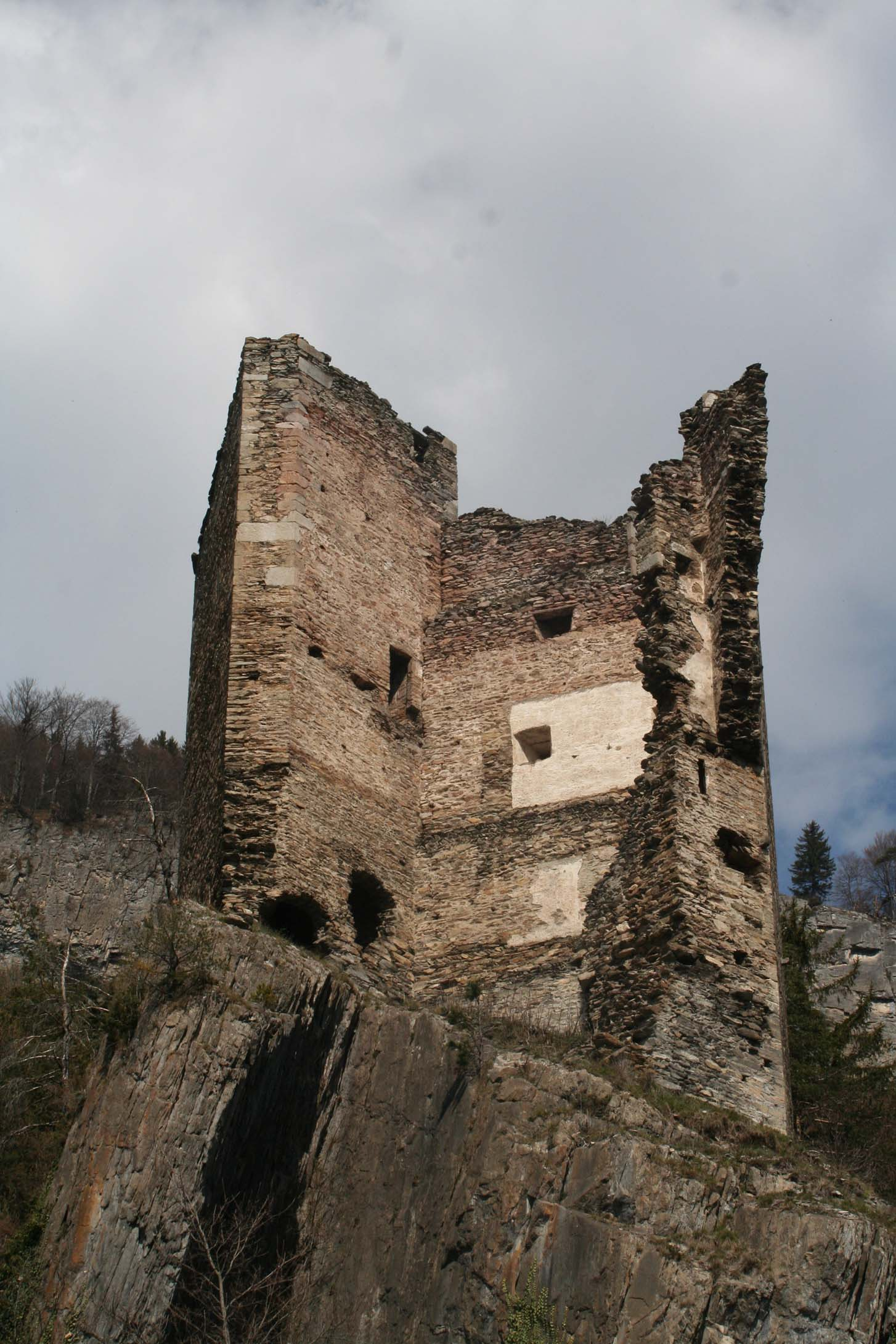
Ruins of Haldenstein fortress

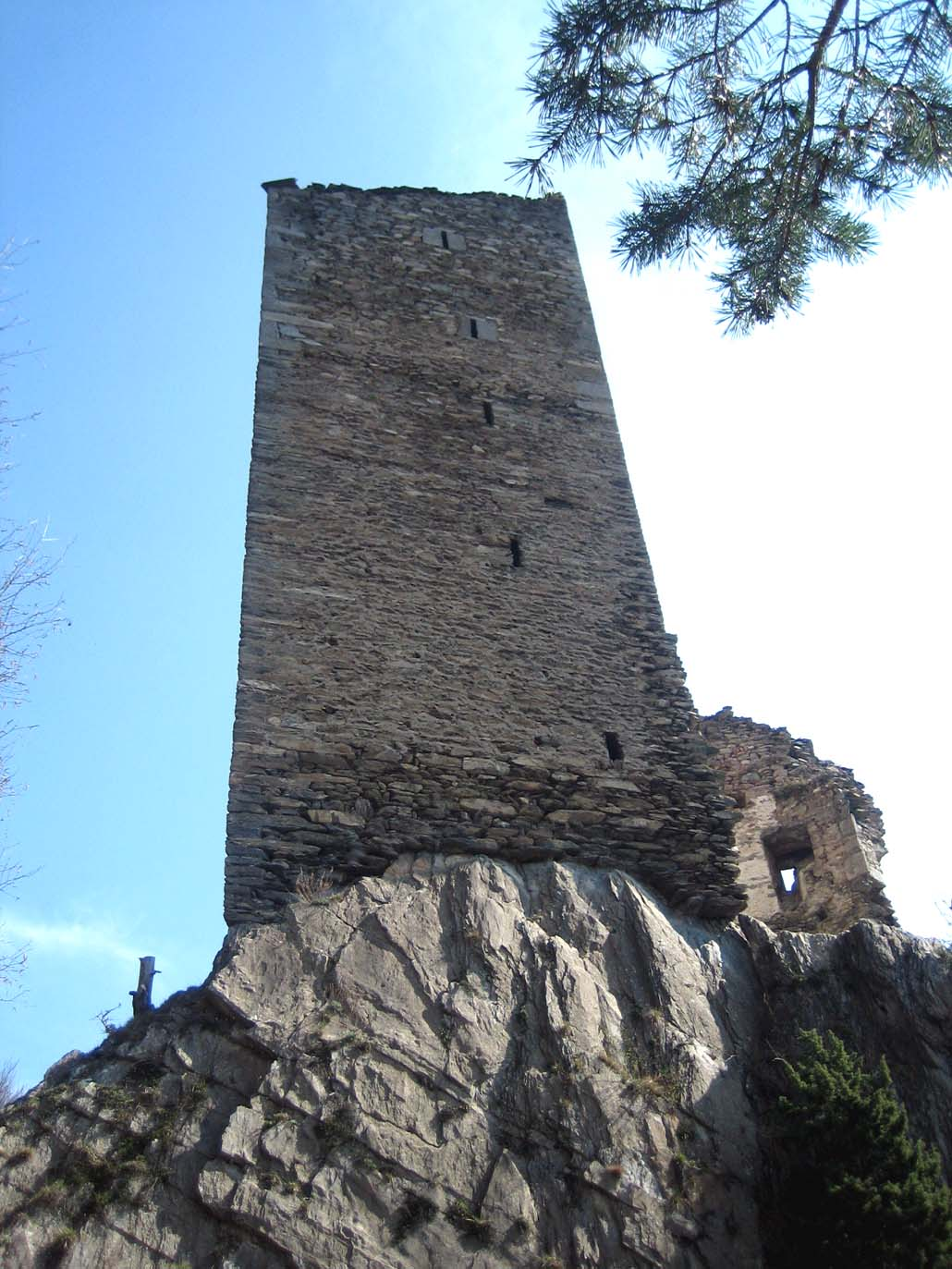
North face of Haldenstein fortress

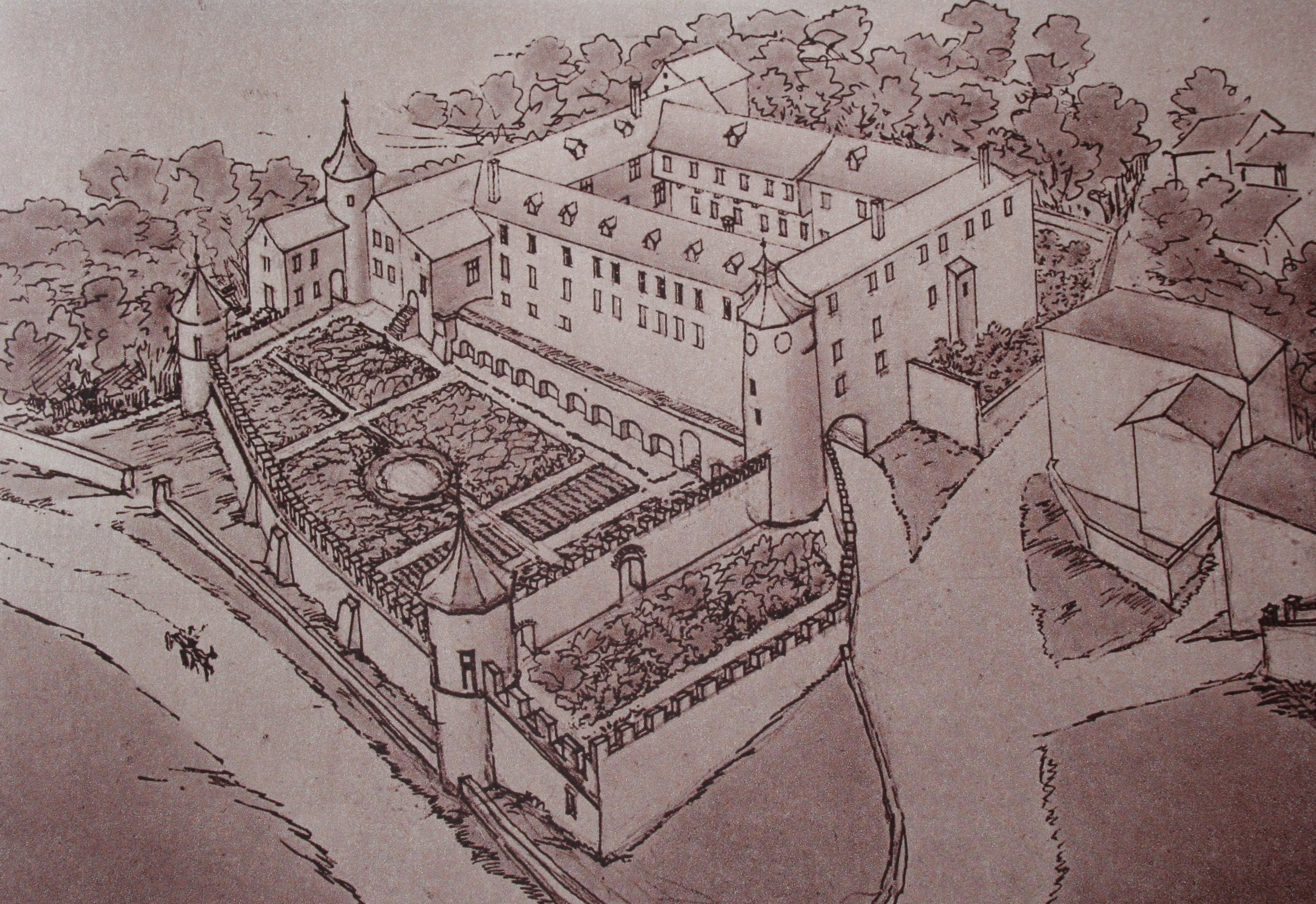
Drawing of Schloss Haldenstein in 1880

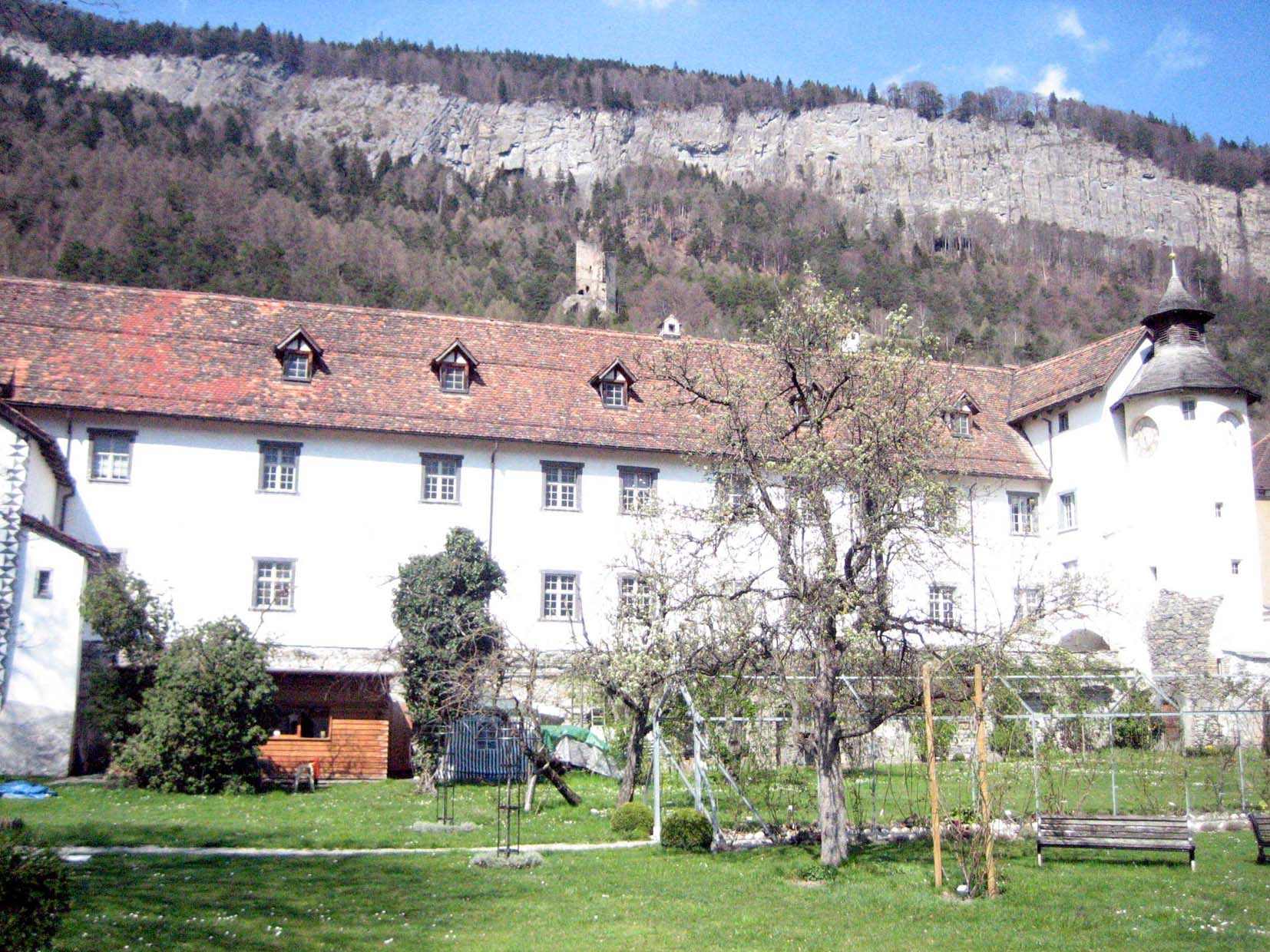
Main building of Schloss Haldenstein

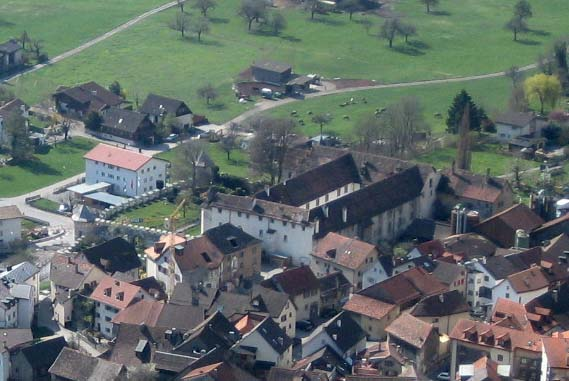
Schloss Haldenstein aerial view

== Notable residents ==
The prize-winning architect Peter Zumthor works out of a small studio in Haldenstein.

== See also ==
- Haldenstein (Rhaetian Railway station)
- Haldensteiner Calanda
