= Peter Zumthor =

Swiss architect (born 1943)

- Zumthor in 2026
- Born: 26 April 1943 (age 83); Basel, Switzerland
- Occupation: Architect
- Awards: Carlsberg Architectural Prize (1998); Praemium Imperiale (2008); Pritzker Prize (2009); Royal Gold Medal (2013)
- Buildings: Therme Vals (1996); Kunsthaus Bregenz (1997); Kolumba (2007)

Peter Zumthor (German pronunciation: [ˈpeːtɐ ˈtsuːmtoːɐ̯]; born 26 April 1943) is a Swiss architect whose work is frequently described as uncompromising and minimalist. Though managing a relatively small firm and not being a prolific architect, he won the 2009 Pritzker Prize and 2013 RIBA Royal Gold Medal.

== Early life ==
Zumthor was born in Basel, Switzerland. His father was a cabinet-maker, which exposed him to design from an early age and led him to become an apprentice for a carpenter later in 1958. He studied at the Kunstgewerbeschule (arts and crafts school) in his native city starting in 1963.

In 1966, Zumthor studied industrial design and architecture as an exchange student at Pratt Institute in New York. In 1968, he became conservationist architect for the Department for the Preservation of Monuments of the canton of Graubünden. This work on historic restoration projects gave him a further understanding of construction and the qualities of different rustic building materials.

As his practice developed, Zumthor was able to incorporate his knowledge of materials into Modernist construction and detailing. His buildings explore the tactile and sensory qualities of spaces and materials while retaining a minimalist feel. It has been said that "Zumthor’s key building material is light."

== Career ==
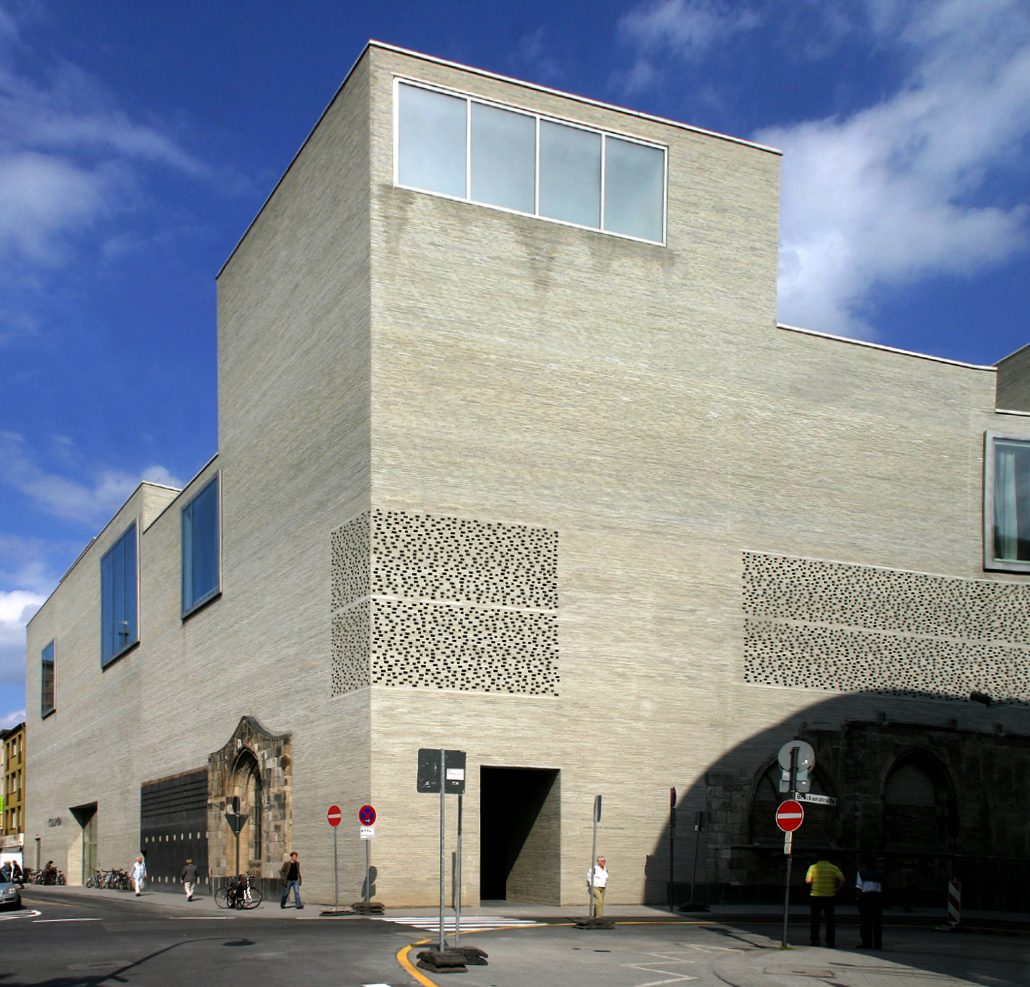
Kolumba Museum, Cologne

Zumthor founded his own firm in 1979. His practice grew quickly and he accepted more international projects.

Zumthor has taught at University of Southern California Institute of Architecture and SCI-ARC in Los Angeles (1988), the Technical University of Munich (1989), Tulane University (1992), and the Harvard Graduate School of Design (1999). Since 1996, he has been a professor at the Accademia di Architettura di Mendrisio.

His best known projects are the Kunsthaus Bregenz (1997), a shimmering glass and concrete cube that overlooks Lake Constance (Bodensee) in Austria; the cave-like thermal baths in Vals, Switzerland (1999); the Swiss Pavilion for Expo 2000 in Hannover, an all-timber structure intended to be recycled after the event; the Kolumba Diocesan Museum (2007), in Cologne; and the Bruder Klaus Field Chapel, on a farm near Wachendorf.

In 1993, Zumthor won the competition for a museum and documentation center on the horrors of Nazism to be built on the site of Gestapo headquarters in Berlin. Zumthor's submission called for an extended three-story building with a framework consisting of concrete rods. The project, called the Topography of Terror, was partly built and then abandoned when the government decided not to go ahead for financial reasons. The unfinished building was demolished in 2004.

In 1999, Zumthor was selected as the only foreign architect to participate in Norway's National Tourist Routes Project, with two projects, the Memorial in Memory of the Victims of the Witch Trials in Varanger, a collaboration with Louise Bourgeois (completed in 2010), and a rest area/museum on the site of an abandoned zinc mine.

For the Dia Art Foundation in Beacon, New York, Zumthor designed a gallery that was to house the 360° I Ching sculpture by Walter de Maria; though the project was never completed. Zumthor is the only foreign architect to participate, with two projects, the Memorial in Memory of the Victims of the Witch Trials in Varanger, a collaboration with Louise Bourgeois (2011), and a rest area/museum on the site of the abandoned Allmannajuvet zinc mines, in operation from 1882 to 1898, in Norway (2016). In November 2009, it was revealed that Zumthor would lead a major redesign for the campus of the Los Angeles County Museum of Art. He turned down an opportunity to consider a new library for Magdalen College, Oxford. He was selected to design the Serpentine Gallery's annual summer pavilion with designer Piet Oudolf in 2011. In 2023, the Werkraum Haus – designed 10 years earlier by Zumthor – showed 40 of his architectural models, including some that have never been shown to the public before.

Currently, Zumthor works out of his small studio with around 30 employees, in Haldenstein, near the city of Chur, in Switzerland.

== Recognition ==
In 1994, he was elected to the Academy of Arts, Berlin. In 1996, he was made an honorary member of the Bund Deutscher Architekten (BDA). In 1998, Zumthor received the Carlsberg Architectural Prize for his designs of the Kunsthaus Bregenz in Bregenz, Austria and the Thermal Baths at Vals, Switzerland (see below). He won the Mies van der Rohe Award for European Architecture in 1999. Recently, he was awarded Praemium Imperiale in 2008 and the Pritzker Architecture Prize 2009. In 2012, he was awarded the RIBA Royal Gold Medal. On the occasion of his 80th birthday in 2023, the F.A.Z. called Zumthor "the great magician of minimalism."

== Literature ==
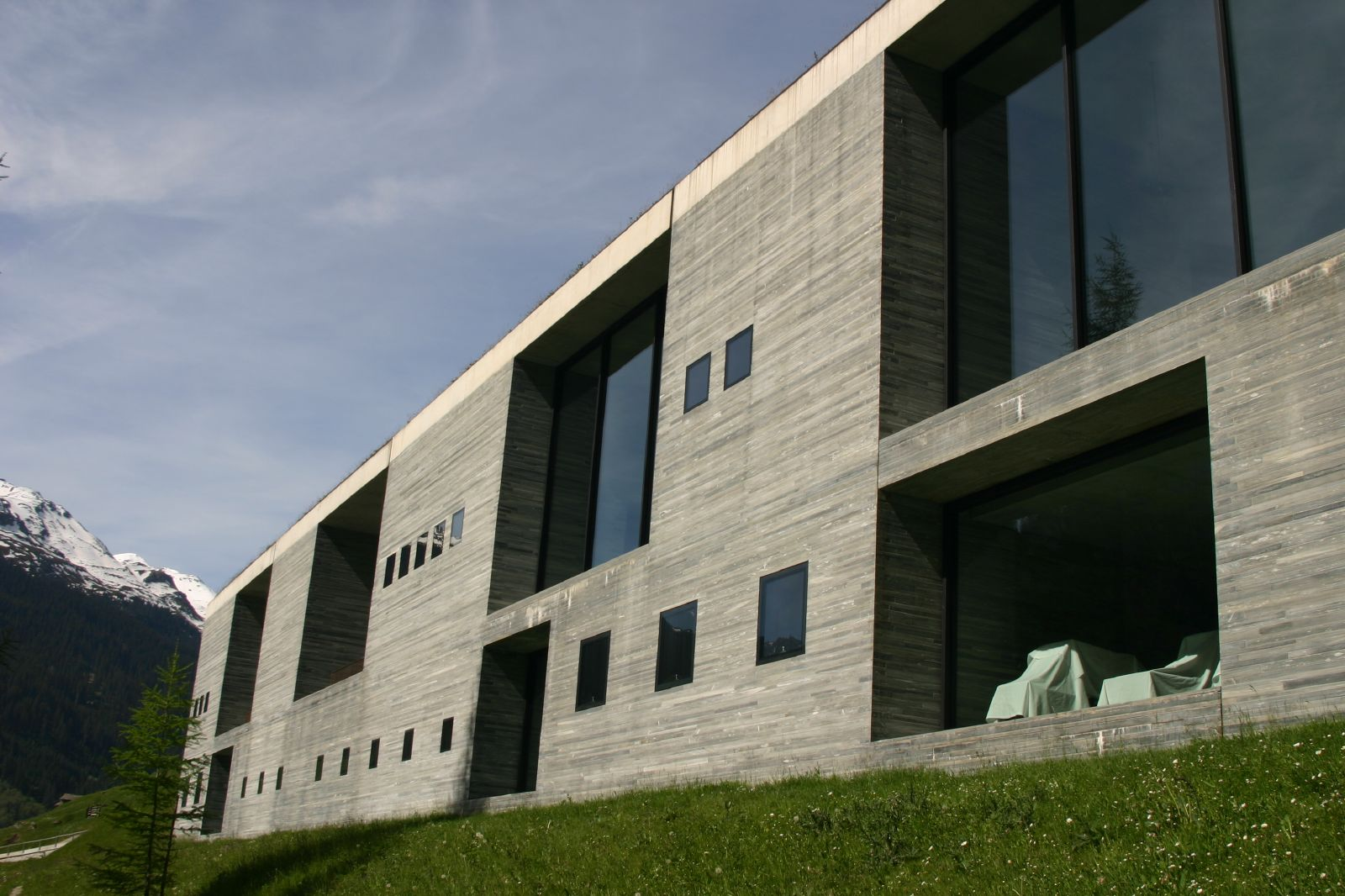
Therme Vals, Switzerland

Zumthor's work is largely unpublished in part because of his philosophical belief that architecture must be experienced first hand. His published written work is mostly narrative and phenomenological.

== Personal ==
Zumthor and his wife, Annalisa Zumthor-Cuorad, have three children. Annalisa died in January 2026 at the age of 78.

== Principal works ==
- 1983 Elementary school Churwalden, Churwalden, Graubünden, Switzerland.
- 1983 House Räth, Haldenstein, Graubünden, Switzerland.
- 1986 Shelters for Roman archaeological site, Chur, Graubünden, Switzerland.
- 1986 Atelier Zumthor, Haldenstein, Graubünden, Switzerland.
- 1989 Saint Benedict Chapel, Sumvitg, Graubünden, Switzerland.
- 1990 Art Museum Chur, Graubünden, Switzerland.
- 1993 Residential home for the elderly, Masans, Chur, Graubünden, Switzerland.
- 1994 Gugalun House, Versam, Graubünden, Switzerland.
- 1996 Spittelhof housing, Biel-Benken, Basel, Switzerland.
- 1996 Therme Vals, Vals, Graubünden, Switzerland.
- 1997 Kunsthaus Bregenz, Bregenz, Vorarlberg, Austria.
- 1997 Topography of Terror, International Exhibition and Documentation Centre, Berlin, Germany, partly built, abandoned, demolished in 2004.
- 1997–2000 Swiss Pavilion EXPO 2000, Hannover, Germany.
- 1997 Villa in Küsnacht am Zürichsee Küsnacht, Switzerland.
- 1997 Lichtforum Zumtobel Staff, Zürich, Switzerland.
- 2007 Bruder Klaus Kapelle, Mechernich-Wachendorf, Germany.
- 2007 Kolumba – Erzbischöfliches Diözesanmuseum, Cologne, Germany.
- 2009 Leiser Ensemble, Leis/Vals, Graubünden, Switzerland
- 2011 Steilneset Memorial for the Victims of the Witch Trials, Vardø, Norway
- 2011 Serpentine Gallery Pavilion 2011, London, England
- 2012 Werkraum Bregenzerwald Hof 800, 6866 Andelsbuch, Austria
- 2016 Rest area/museum, Allmannajuvet zinc mines, Norway
- 2018 'Secular Retreat' summer villa for Living Architecture, Salcombe, Devon, England
- 2026 LACMA David Geffen Galleries - Los Angeles County Museum of Art, David Geffen Galleries, Los Angeles, California, U.S.A.
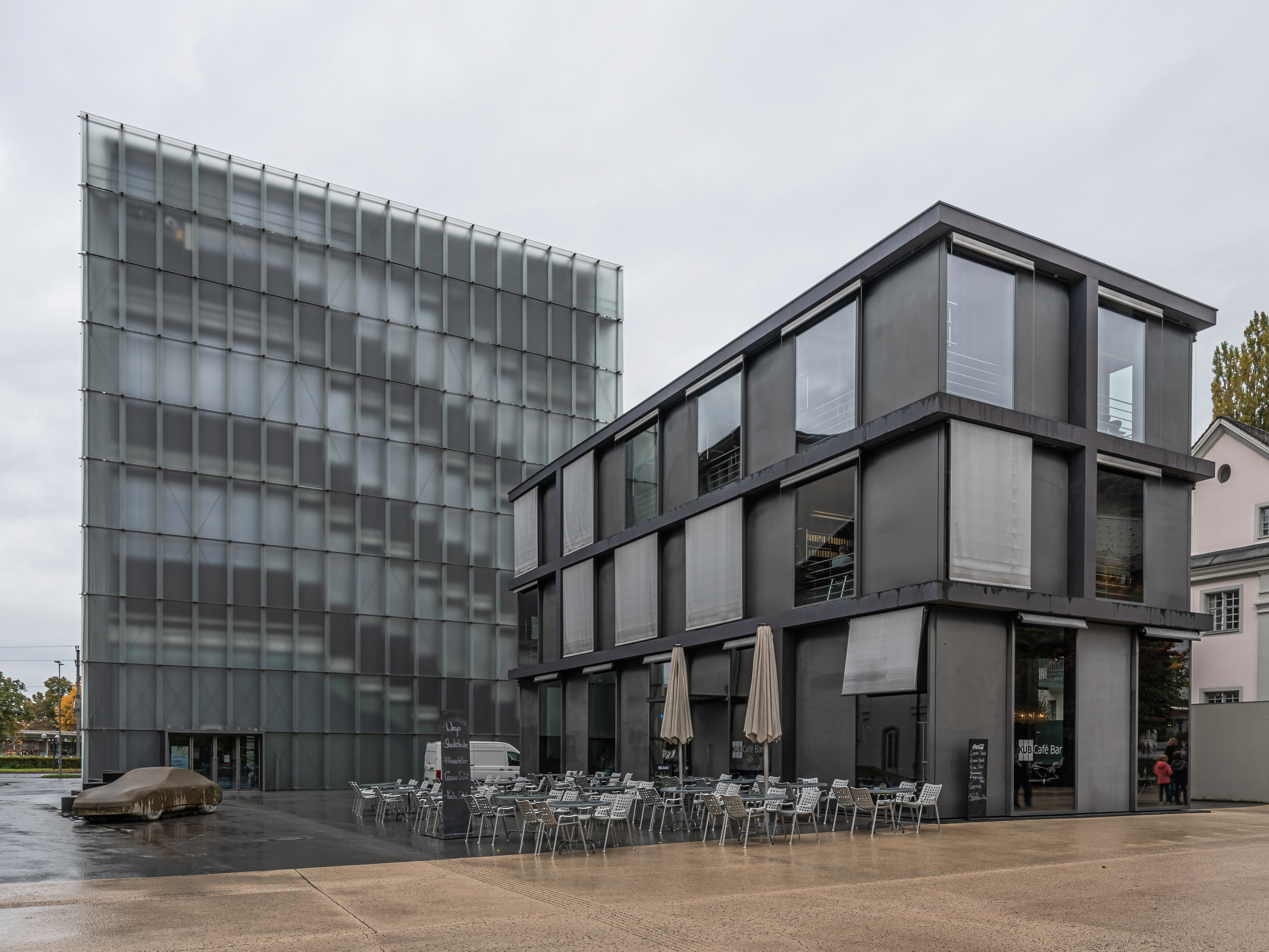
Kunsthaus Bregenz

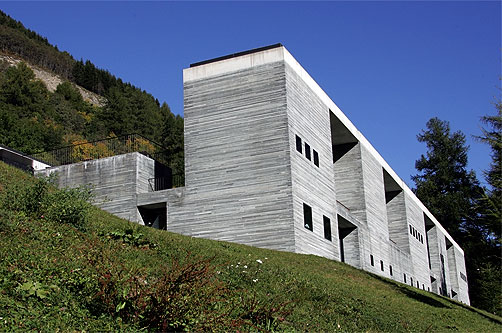
Therme Vals

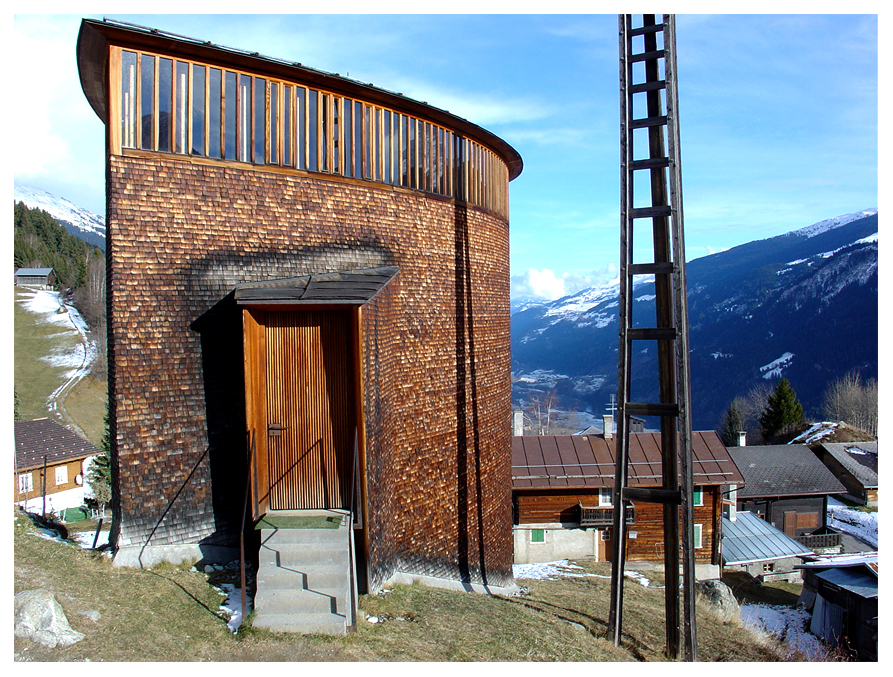
St. Benedict Chapel

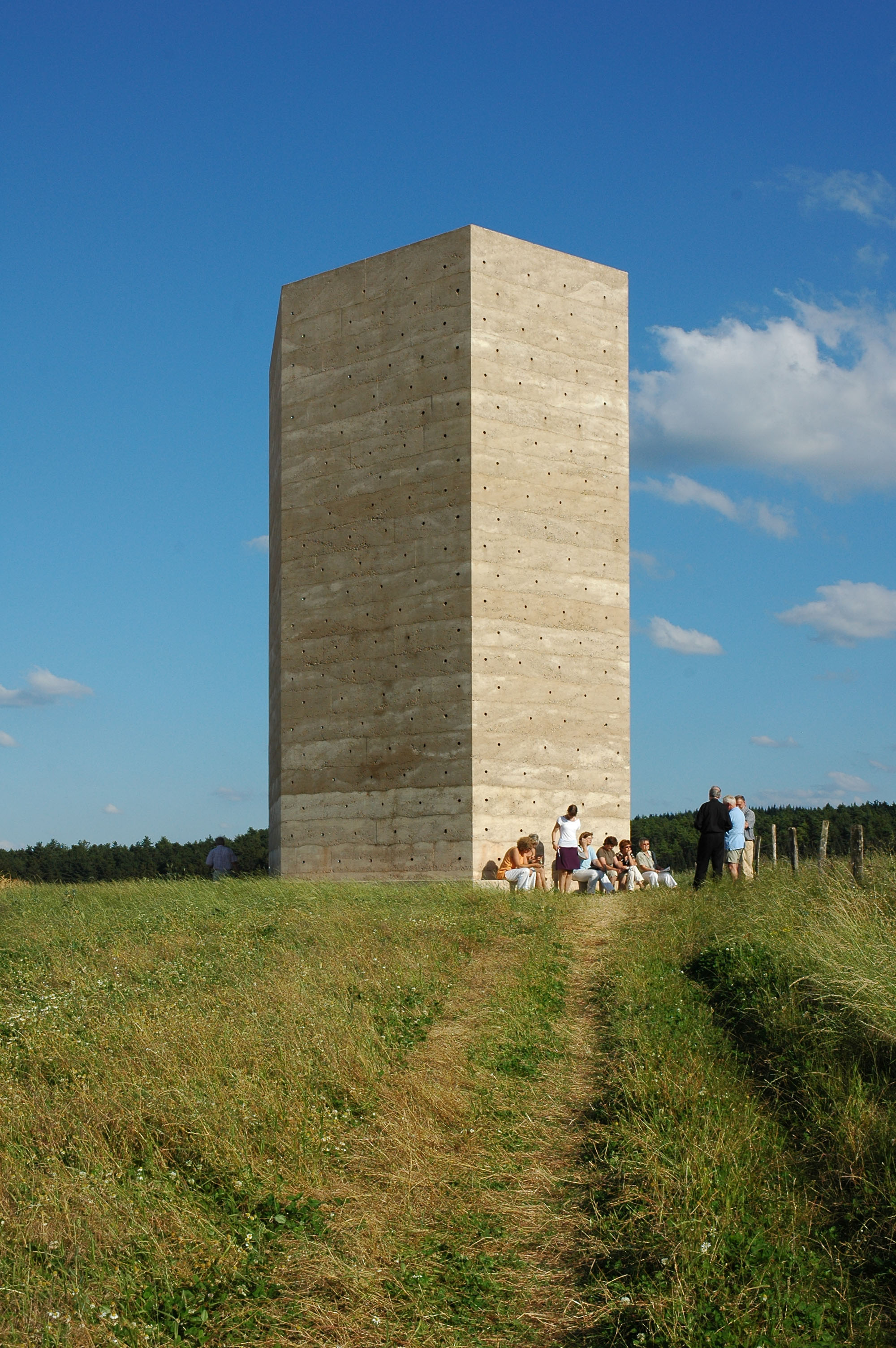
Bruder Klaus Chapel

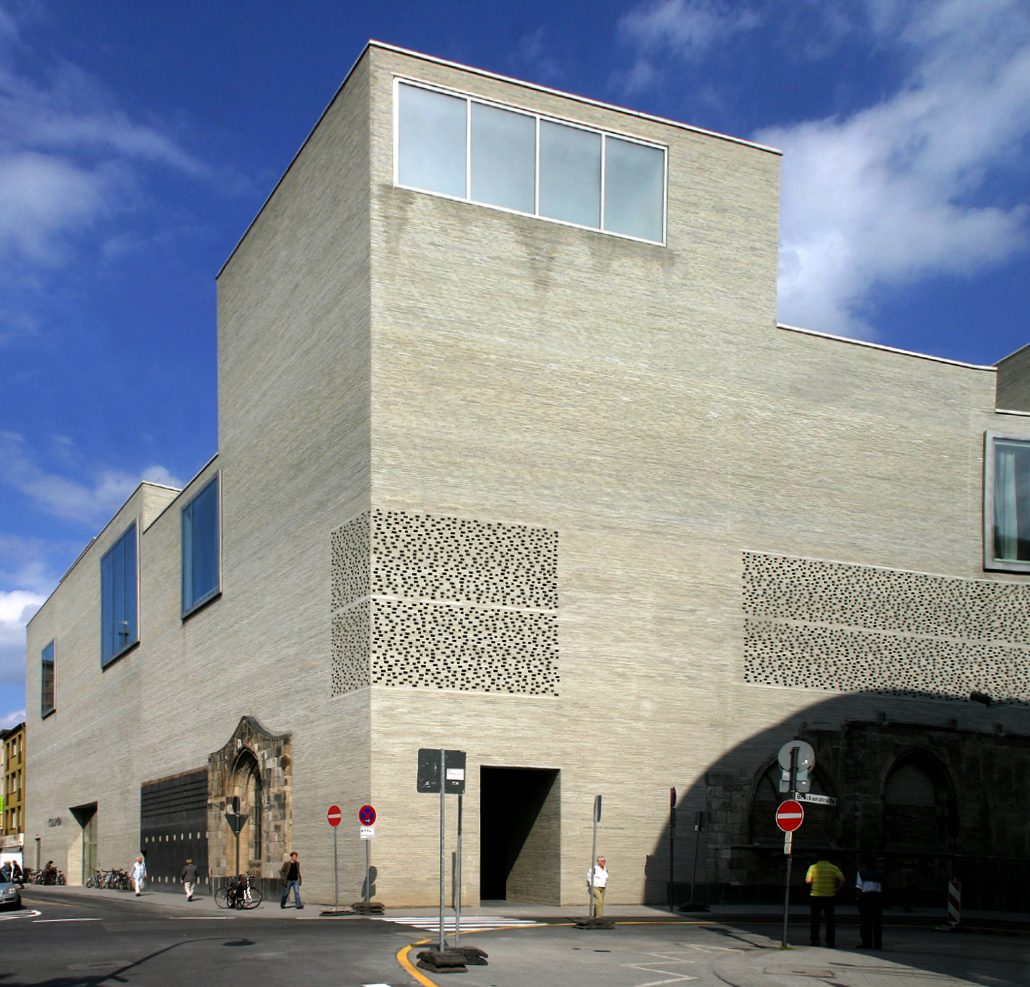
Kolumba—Erzbischöfliches Diözesanmuseum

== Awards ==
- 1987, 2017: Auszeichnungen für gute Bauten Graubünden, Switzerland.
- 1989: Heinrich Tessenow medal, Technische Universität Hannover, Germany.
- 1991: Gulam, European wood-glue prize.
- 1992: Internationaler Architekturpreis für Neues Bauen in den Alpen, Graubünden, Switzerland.
- 1993: Best Building 1993 award from Swiss tc's 10vor10, Graubünden, Switzerland.
- 1994: Auszeichnung guter Bauten im Kanton Graubünden, Switzerland.
- 1995: International Prize for Stone Architecture, Fiera di Verona, Italy.
- 1995: Internationaler Architekturpreis für Neues Bauen in den Alpen, Graubünden, Switzerland.
- 1996: Erich-Schelling-Preis für Architektur, Erich-Schelling-Stiftung, Germany.
- 1998: European Union Prize for Contemporary Architecture (aka Mies van der Rohe Award) for Kunsthaus Bregenz.
- 1998: Carlsberg Architectural Prize.
- 2006: Spirit of Nature Wood Architecture Award.
- 2006: Thomas Jefferson Foundation Medal in Architecture, University of Virginia.
- 2008: Praemium Imperiale, Japan Arts Association
- 2009: Pritzker Prize
- 2013: RIBA Royal Gold Medal for 2013, announced September 2012, award ceremony February 2013
- 2017: Großer BDA Preis

== Former co-workers and assistants ==
- 1981–1987: Jürg Conzett
- 1984–1988: Valentin Bearth
- Andrea Deplazes
- 1985: Conradin Clavuot
- 1990–199?: Donatella Fioretti
- 1993–1996: Durisch Nolli|Pia Durisch (Assistant)
- 1993–1998: Daniel Bosshard
- 1996–1998: Gordian Blumenthal
- 1997–1998: Bosshard Vaquer|Meritxell Vaquer i Fernàndez
- 2000: Uta Graff
- 2001–2002: Francesca Torzo
- 2003–2006: Clemens Nuyken
- Peter Hutter

See the German Wikipedia for details.
