= Swiss Art Awards =

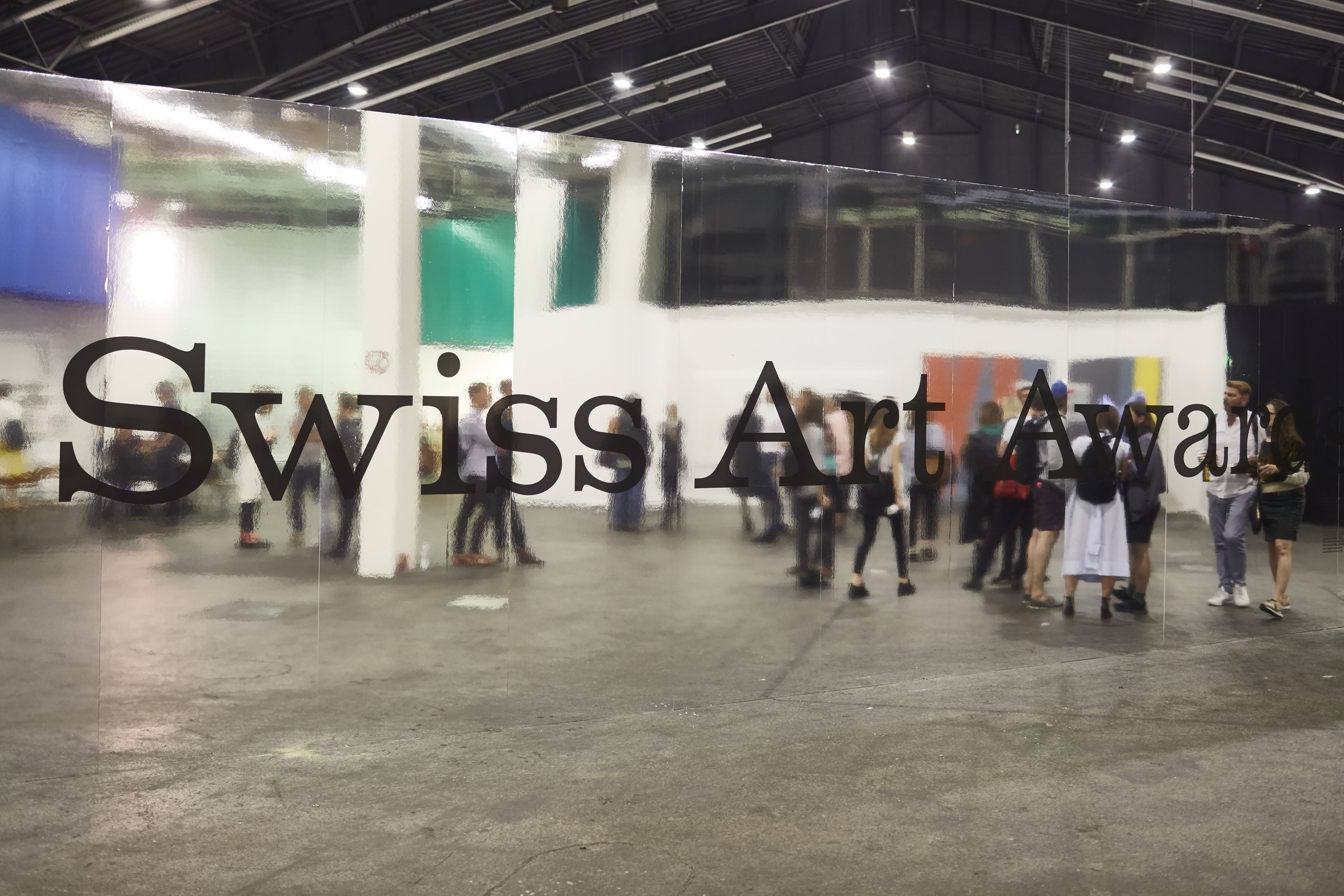
Swiss Art Awards 2018

The Swiss Art Awards, also named the Federal Art Competition, are recognitions that are awarded by the Federal Office of Culture (FOC) in the name of the Confederation.

== History ==
The Swiss Art Awards stem from the oldest and most important measure of support to the arts of Switzerland. They began in 1898 "as a federal grant for young artists, so as to raise the quality of Swiss Art."

The competition and awards have been managed by the FOC since its introduction in 1975.

The grants eventually turned into a competition, changing the name to Federal Art Competition in 1994 and Swiss Art Awards since 2014. The Swiss Art Awards competition and show are held during Art Basel since 1994.

Since 2001, three to four Swiss Grand Awards for Art/Prix Meret Oppenheim are presented, out of a competition run by the Federal Commission for Art (FCA).

== Principals ==
Artists, architects, art, and architecture mediators of Swiss origins or based in Switzerland, can submit their application to the FOC. After a first round the FCA chooses a selection of nominees who participate in the show and are considered for the award. Out of these, around ten candidates receive an award for their work along with 25,000 Swiss francs.

The Swiss Grand Award for Art/Prix Meret Oppenheim on the other hand are awarded by the FCA out of a competition to individuals that have contributed to the study and influence of contemporary Swiss arts and architecture. These distinctions are accompanied with 40,000 Swiss francs to each winner to be used to fund an important project.
