= Ákos =

- Gender: masculine
- Language: Hungarian
- Name day: February 27

Origin
- Language: Turkish
- Meaning: "white falcon"

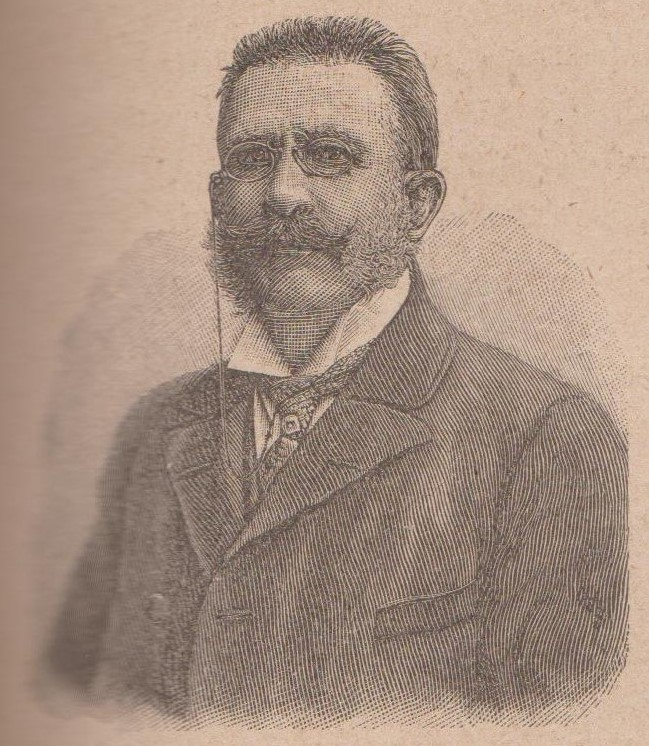
Timon Akos

Ákos is a Hungarian name. Today, it is mainly a masculine given name.

It may refer to:

== Middle Ages ==
- Ákos (clan), a medieval Hungarian clan
  - Ákos (chronicler) (d. after 1273)
  - Ernye Ákos (d. after 1275)

== Given name ==
- Ákos Szabó, (born 2004) Hungarian software developer at Tesla
- Ákos Ajtony, (1944-2017), Hungarian equestrian
- Ákos Angyal, Hungarian sprint canoer
- Ákos Baki (born 1994), Hungarian footballer
- Ákos Barcsay (1619–1661), Prince of Transylvania
- Ákos Bertalan Apatóczky (born 1974), Hungarian Sinologist and Mongolist
- Ákos Birtalan (1962–2011), Romanian economist and politician
- Ákos Borbély (born 2000), Hungarian footballer
- Ákos Braun (born 1978), Hungarian judoka
- Ákos Buzsáky (born 1982), Hungarian footballer
- Ákos Csányi (died between 1568 and 1575), Hungarian nobleman and soldier
- Ákos Császár (1924–2017), Hungarian mathematician
- Ákos Dobrády (born 1975), Hungarian singer
- Ákos Elek (born 1988), Hungarian footballer
- Ákos Elekfy (born 1923), Hungarian speed skater
- Ákos Eleőd (born 1961), Hungarian architect
- Ákos Farkas (1894–1955), Hungarian jurist and politician
- Ákos Füzi (born 1978), Hungarian footballer and club manager
- Ákos Gacsal (born 1994), Hungarian-Slovak sprint canoeist
- Ákos Gulyás (born 1942), Hungarian swimmer
- Ákos Hadházy (born 1974), Hungarian veterinarian and politician
- Ákos Haller (born 1976), Hungarian rower
- Ákos Hanzély (born 1969), Hungarian pentathlete
- Ákos Hargitai (born 1964), Hungarian contemporary dancer
- Ákos Hudi (born 1991), Hungarian hammer thrower
- Ákos Inotay (1911–1960), Hungarian rower
- Ákos Kállai (born 1974), Hungarian pentathlete
- Ákos Kalmár (born 2000). Hungarian swimmer
- Ákos Kara (born 1975), Hungarian politician
- Ákos Kecskés (born 1996), Hungarian footballer
- Ákos Keller (born 1989), Hungarian basketball player
- Ákos Kertész (1932–2022), Hungarian writer and screenwriter
- Ákos Kinyik (born 1993), Hungarian footballer
- Ákos Koller (born 1974), Romanian-Hungarian footballer
- Ákos Kónya (born 1974), Hungarian ultramarathon runner
- Ákos Kovács (1903–1980), Hungarian radiologist
- Ákos Kovács (born 1968), Hungarian singer-songwriter
- Ákos Kovrig (born 1982), Hungarian footballer
- Ákos Kriza (1965–2021), Hungarian politician
- Ákos Lippai (born 1979), Hungarian footballer
- Ákos Molnár (1893–1945), Hungarian writer
- Ákos Molnár (born 1987), Hungarian swimmer
- Ákos Moravánszky (born 1950), Swiss-Hungarian architect, theorist, historian, and professor
- Ákos Onódi (born 2001), Hungarian football goalkeeper
- Ákos Pásztor (born 1991), Hungarian handballer
- Ákos Pauler (1876–1933), Hungarian philosopher
- Ákos Ráthonyi (1908–1969), film director and screenwriter
- Ákos Rózmann (1939–2005), Hungarian-Swedish composer and organist
- Ákos Seper (born 1979), Hungarian footballer
- Ákos Szarka (born 1990), Slovak-Hungarian footballer
- Ákos Szendrei (born 2003), Hungarian footballer
- Ákos Takács (born 1982), Hungarian footballer
- Ákos Tolnay (1903–1981), Hungarian screenwriter
- Ákos Tulipán (born 1990), Hungarian football goalkeeper
- Ákos Vereckei (born 1977), Hungarian sprint canoeist
- Ákos Zuigéber (born 2002), Hungarian footballer

== See also ==
- Ákos, the Hungarian name for Acâș, a commune in Satu Mare County, Romania
- Ákosfalva, the Hungarian name for Acățari, a commune in Mureș County, Romania
