= Langenberg =

Langenberg can refer to:

== People ==
- Arend Langenberg (1949-2012), Dutch voice actor and radio presenter
- Claudia Langenberg (born 1972), German epidemiologist
- Donald N. Langenberg (1932-2019), American physicist
- James Van Langenberg, 5th Solicitor General of Ceylon
- Silke Langenberg (born 1974) is a German-Swiss heritage scientist and architect

== Places ==
- Langenberg (Bad Harzburg), a hill in northwestern Germany with international archaeological and geological importance
- Langenberg (Habichtswald), a hill range in the Habichtswald Highlands, Hesse
- Langenberg (Reinhardswald), a hill in Hesse
- Langenberg (Rothaar), the highest mountain in northwestern Germany, located in the Rothaargebirge mountains
- Langenberg (Rhineland), an independent town until 1975, now a borough of Velbert
- Langenberg (Westphalia), a municipality in eastern Westphalia

== Other ==
- Langenberg transmission tower, Velbert, Germany
- Langenberg Wildlife Park, Langnau am Albis, Switzerland

== See also ==
- Langenburg
- Langeberg (disambiguation)
