= ETH Zurich Faculty of Architecture =

Architecture school in Zurich, Switzerland

Department of Architecture at ETH Zurich (D-ARCH)
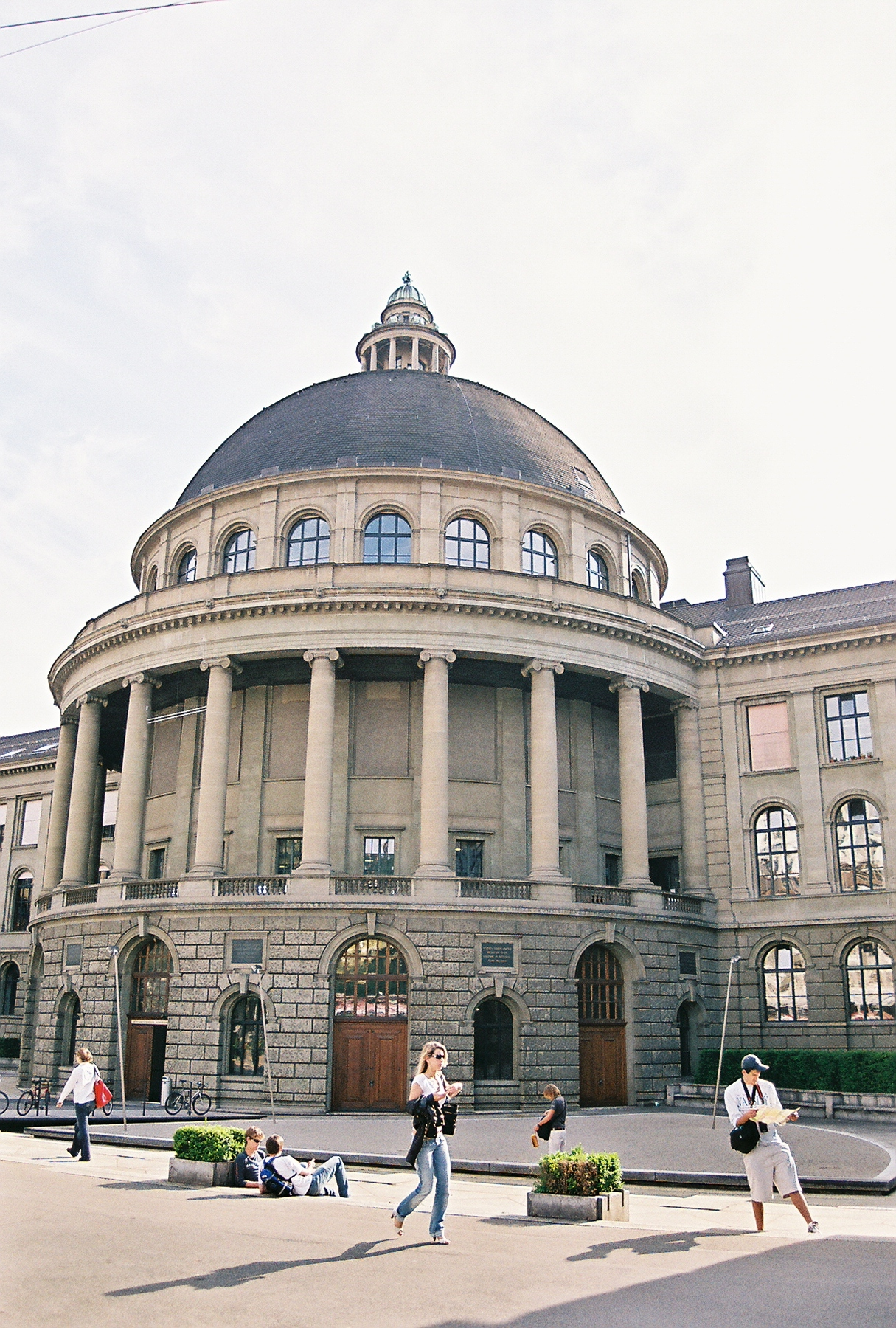
- Established: 1854
- Faculty: 0
- Students: 2000
- Location: Zürich, Canton of Zürich, Switzerland
- Campus: Urban
- Website: www.arch.ethz.ch

Founded in 1854, the Department of Architecture (D-ARCH) at ETH Zurich in Switzerland is an architecture school in Zürich, providing education in the fields of architecture, landscape architecture, urban planning, and urban design. It has around 2,100 students, 350 staff members, and an annual budget of CHF 40 million.

== History ==
1854: A Parliamentary resolution establishes a federal polytechnic school in Zurich, on the basis of the 1848 constitution.

15 October 1855: Opening of the ‘Swiss Federal Polytechnic School’ with six divisions, including the Engineering School and – although not originally envisaged – the ‘Building School’.

Gottfried Semper, not only a successful architect of monumental buildings but also an established theorist and teacher, was appointed the first professor and director of the Building School. His educational model of the atelier libre, oriented on the École des Beaux-Arts in Paris, conflicts with the polytechnic school's profile, which is chiefly practical and technically oriented. The pupils worked in the drafting room on practical assignments, competed in rivalries and contributed to Sempers's own projects. Semper succeeded in changing the title of the degree from ‘master builder’ to ‘architect’, but he nonetheless failed to extend the three-year duration of studies.

1857: The second professorial chair, focused on civil engineering, is filled by Ernst Gladbach.

1864: The Building School relocates to the newly built polytechnic, erected according to plans by Semper, where it occupies the ground floor of the north and west wings.

1866: Maximum of 52 students (consistently below 100 until 1914).

1871: Semper's departure. Julius Stadler and George Lasius continue to teach in his spirit, but the school is in danger of ossifying.

1881: With the appointment of Friedrich Bluntschli – an esteemed architect in the tradition of Semper, albeit far more formalistic – the instruction focuses entirely on the Renaissance vocabulary.

1882: The studies are extended to seven semesters.

1899: The Building School is renamed as the ‘Architecture School’ and again in 1924 as the ‘Architecture Division’.

1900: Gustav Gull, Zurich's municipal architect, is appointed as professor. Reform architecture arrives, and the differentiation between monumental and civil architecture becomes obsolete. Gull introduces the discipline of ‘urban design’ into the curriculum.

1904: The diploma thesis is separated from the seven semesters of the study programme.

1911: The polytechnic is renamed as the ‘Swiss Federal Institute of Technology Zurich’.

1914: With Bluntschli's retirement, instruction in the classical vocabulary is largely curtailed, finally ending in 1925 with the appointment of Friedrich Hess as the successor to Lasius.

1915: Karl Moser is appointed as professor Gull and Moser increasingly advocate two conflicting architectural views; Gull is considered regressive and Moser, by contrast, is seen as progressive – and as one of the forefathers of modern architecture.

1917: By reorganising the subjects of structural mechanics, structural analysis and engineering design, the division of responsibilities between engineers and architects we commonly know today is firmly established.

1929: After Moser's retirement (1928) as well as Gull's restructuring and the reformation of the architecture division by his successors, Otto Rudolf Salvisberg and William Dunkel: To avoid the coexistence of competing architectural ideas, the instruction is divided into a succession of two-semester courses, each of which is overseen by a single professor and which comprise tasks that are progressively more complex. The curriculum is given a stronger design orientation, where structural analysis and building construction are closely aligned.

1931: Work experience is anchored in the curriculum by implementing a mandatory six-month internship (one year since 1945).

1941: Hans Hofmann follows O. R. Salvisberg.

1959: Over 400 students enrolled. William Dunkel retires. The teaching is reorganised: The foundation course developed substantially by Bernhard Hoesli conveys the principles of modern architecture in a systematic way, thus making it is possible to simultaneously permit differing tendencies and understandings of (modern) architecture in the upper-level courses. The teaching staff is expanded, and now includes visiting professors like Georges Candilis, Ralph Erskine, Jørn Utzon and Aldo Rossi (1972–1974), whose design methodologies have been influential until very recently.

1960: The duration of study is extended to eight semesters (plus diploma thesis).

The architecture division develops an increasingly more scientific orientation New subjects, such as sociology (1962, Lucius Burckhardt), are introduced The teaching principles for architectural design are systematised by Hoesli (the teaching principles for construction are later systematised by Heinz Ronner and those for design by Peter Jenny) Research institutes established: – Institute for Local, Regional and National Planning ORL (1961; reorganised in 2002 as the Network City and Landscape NSL) – Institute for the History and Theory of Architecture gta (1967) – Institute for Building Research HBF (1969; abolished 1985) – Institute for Building Technology HBT (1972; since 2009: Institute of Technology in Architecture ITA) – Institute of Historic Building Research ID (1972; now: Institute of Historic Building Research and Conservation IDB)

1968: Additional space is taken up in the so-called Globus Provisorium at the Bahnhofbrücke Zürich.

1972: A two-year rotation cycle is established for the dean.

Mid-1970s: Over 1000 students enrolled.

1976: Under great protest, the architecture division relocates to the ETH annex on the Hönggerberg campus.

1980s: In light of the pluralism of international architecture and through ETH's own research, the supposedly clear profile of the school, based on modernism, is increasingly called into question. The stringent didactic concept of the foundation course at the beginning of the programme is fragmented.

The school, called the Department of Architecture since 1999, gains more autonomy. In accordance with the ETH's policies focused on international excellence, research takes on greater significance. This is reflected in the numerous publications issued by the chairs and institutes and in a significant increase in the number of doctorates.

2007: Introduction of a six-semester bachelor programme and a four-semester master programme in compliance with standards defined by the Bologna Process.

== Lecturers ==
=== Current lecturers ===
- Tom Avermaete, Professor, Chair of History and Theory of Urban Design
- Rosa Barba, Professor, Chair of Art in Space and Time
- Bernd Bickel, Professor, Chair of Computational Design
- Philippe Block, Professor, Chair of Architecture and Structure
- Roger Boltshauser, Professor, Chair of Architecture and Regenerative Materials
- Arno Brandlhuber, Professor, Chair of Architecture and Design
- Adam Caruso, Professor, Chair of Architecture and Technology
- François Charbonnet, Professor, Chair of Architecture and Design
- Emanuel Christ, Professor, Chair of Architecture and Design
- Maria Conen, Professor, Chair of Architecture and Housing
- Benjamin Dillenburger, Professor, Chair of Digital Building Technologies
- Tom Emerson, Professor, Chair of Architecture and Construction
- Christoph Gantenbein, Professor, Chair of Architecture and Design
- Fabio Gramazio, Professor, Chair of Architecture and Digital Fabrication
- Patrick Heiz, Professor, Chair of Architecture and Design
- Stefan M. Holzer, Professor, Chair of Building Archaeology and Construction History
- Ludger Hovestadt, Professor, Chair of Computer-Aided Architectural Design
- Mariam Issoufou Mahamado, Professor, Chair of Architecture Heritage and Sustainability
- Momoyo Kaijima, Professor, Chair of Architectural Behaviorology
- Hubert Klumpner, Professor, Chair of Architecture and Urban Design
- Matthias Kohler, Professor, Chair of Architecture and Digital Fabrication
- Silke Langenberg, Professor, Chair of Construction Heritage and Preservation
- Sacha Menz, Professor, Chair of Architecture and Building Process
- Elli Mosayebi, Professor, Chair of Architecture and Design
- Jacqueline Pauli, Professor, Chair of Structural Design
- Freek Persyn, Professor, Chair of Architecture and Urban Transformation
- Anna Puigjaner, Professor, Chair of Architecture and Care
- Arno Schlüter, Professor, Chair of Architecture and Building Systems
- Laurent Stalder, Professor of Theory of Architecture
- Alexandre Theriot, Professor, Chair of Architecture and Design
- Milica Topalovic, Associate Professor of Architecture and Territorial Planning
- Philip Ursprung, Professor, Chair of the History of Art and Architecture
- Martina Voser, Professor, Chair of Landscape Architecture

=== Notable former lecturers ===
- Andrea Deplazes, Professor, Chair of Architecture and Technology
- Christian Kerez, Professor, Chair of Architecture and Design
- Christian Schmid, Honorary Professor of Sociology
- Mathias Heinz, Visiting Professor of Architectural Design
- Günther Vogt, Professor, Chair of Landscape Architecture
- Ursula Stücheli, Visiting Professor of Architectural Design
- Jan Carmeliet, Professor, Chair of Building Physics
- Andreas Tönnesmann, Professor, Chair of the History of Art and Architecture
- Gerhard Schmitt, Professor, Chair of Information Architecture
- Joseph Schwartz, Professor, Chair of Structural Design
- Miroslav Šik, Professor, Chair of Architecture and Design
- Annette Spiro, Professor, Chair of Architecture and Technology
- Ákos Moravánszky, Honorary Professor of Theory of Architecture
- Markus Peter, Professor, Chair of Architecture and Technology
- Karin Sander, Professor, Chair of Architecture and Art
- Wolfgang Schett, Professor, Chair of Architecture and Design
- Peter Märkli, Professor, Chair of Architecture and Technology
- Vittorio Magnago Lampugnani, Professor, Chair of the History of Urban Design
- Josep Lluis Mateo, Professor, Chair of Architecture and Design
- Beat Mathys, Visiting Professor of Architectural Design
- Marcel Meili, Professor, Chair of Architecture and Design
- Winy Maas, Visiting Professor of Architectural Design
- Hansjürg Leibundgut, Professor, Chair of Building Systems
- Alexander Lehnerer, Assistant Professorship of Architecture and Urban Design
- Jacques Herzog, Professor, Chair of Architecture and Design, Pritzker Prize
- Pierre de Meuron, Professor, Chair of Architecture and Design, Pritzker Prize
- Uta Hassler, Professor, Chair of Historic Building Research and Conservation
- Dirk Hebel, Assistant Professorship of Architecture and Urban Design
- Christophe Girot, Professor, Chair of Landscape Architecture
- Mike Guyer, Professor, Chair of Architecture and Construction
- Annette Gigon, Professor, Chair of Architecture and Construction
- Dietmar Eberle, Professor, Chair of Architecture and Design
- Roger Diener, Professor, Chair of Architecture and Design
- Kees Christiaanse, Professor, Chair of Architecture and Urban Design
- Gion A. Caminada, Professor, Chair of Architecture and Design
- Marc Angélil, Professor, Chair of Architecture and Design
- Jacob Burckhardt, Swiss historian of art and culture (Professor at the ETH)
- Peter Eisenman, American architect (Design Studio at ETH)
- Paul Feyerabend, Austrian philosopher of science (Professor at the ETH)
- Pascal Flammer, Swiss architect (Design Studio at ETH)
- Tony Fretton, British architect (Design Studio at ETH)
- Frank Gehry, American architect (Design Studio at ETH), Pritzker Prize
- Giorgio Grassi, Italian architect (Design Studio at ETH)
- Dieter Kienast, Swiss landscape architect (Professor at the ETH)
- Hans Kollhoff, German architect (Professor at the ETH)
- Daniel Libeskind, American architect (Design Studio at ETH)
- Greg Lynn, American architect (Design Studio at ETH)
- Christian Menn, Swiss bridge designer (Professor at the ETH)
- Valerio Olgiati, Swiss architect (Design Studio at ETH)
- Jørn Utzon, Danish architect (Guest Professor at the ETH), Pritzker Prize
- Smiljan Radic, Chilean architect (Design Studio at ETH)
- Philippe Rahm, Swiss architect (Design Studio at ETH)
- Hani Rashid, Asymptote, American architect (Design Studio at ETH)
- Aldo Rossi, Italian architect (Professor at the ETH) Pritzker Prize
- Florian Sauter, Austrian architect (Design Studio at ETH)
- Kazuyo Sejima, SANAA, Japanese architect (Design Studio at ETH), Pritzker Prize
- Gottfried Semper, German architect (Professor at the ETH and Founder of the ETH)
- Eduardo Souto de Moura, Portuguese architect (Guest Professor at the ETH), Pritzker Prize
- Dominique Perrault, French architect (Design Studio at ETH)
- Elia Zenghelis, Greek architect (Design Studio at ETH)
- Raphael Zuber, Swiss architect (Design Studio at ETH)

=== Notable graduates ===
- Hendrik Petrus Berlage, architect
- Aldo van Eyck
- Santiago Calatrava, architect
- Angela Deuber, architect
- Max Frisch, architect
- Jacques Herzog (also professor at the ETH, Pritzker Prize in 2001)
- Pierre de Meuron (also professor at the ETH, Pritzker Prize in 2001)
- Aldo Rossi, architect (professor at the ETH, Pritzker Prize in 1990)
- Bernard Tschumi, architect
- Justus Dahinden
- Konstantin Jovanović
- Schak Bull, Norwegian architect
- John Engh, Norwegian architect
- Othmar Ammann, Swiss-American structural engineer
- Karl Moser
- Valerio Olgiati, Swiss architect
- Hans Benno Bernoulli
- Bernhard Hoesli (also a professor at the ETH)
- William Lescaze
- Christian Kerez (also a professor at the ETH)
- Werner M. Moser (also a professor at the ETH)
- Max Ernst Haefeli, Swiss architect
- Hans Auer
- Alfred Friedrich Bluntschli
- Livio Vacchini (also a professor at the ETH)
- Annette Gigon, Gigon/Guyer (also a professor at the ETH)
- Luigi Snozzi, Swiss architect
- Raphael Zuber, Swiss architect

== Institutes & Networks ==
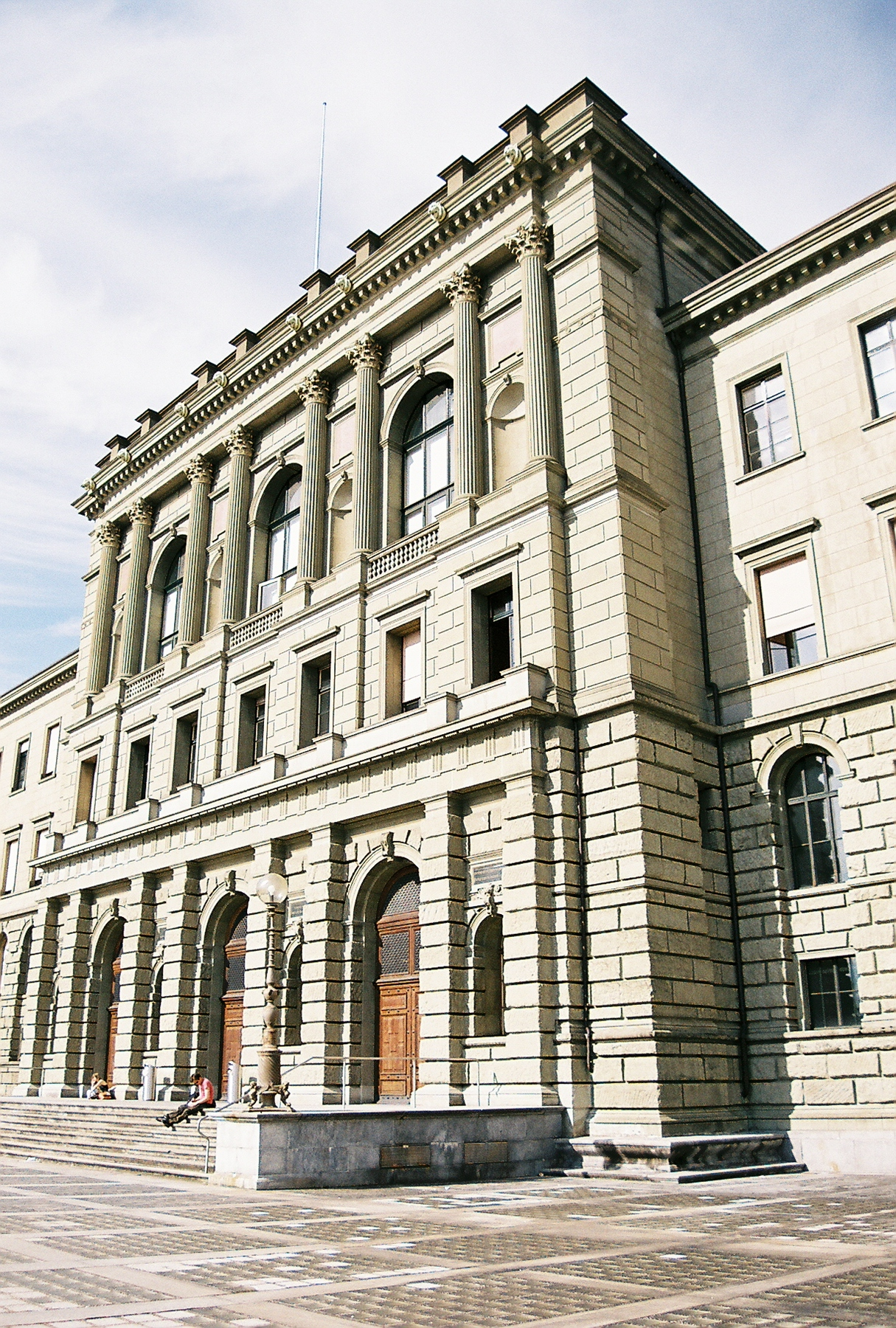
ETH Zürich Zentrum

- IEA - Institute of Design and Architecture
- GTA - Institute for the History and Theory of Architecture
- IDB - Institute for Preservation and Construction History
- ITA - Institute of Technology in Architecture
- LUS - Institute for Landscape and Urban Studies
- NSL - Network City and Landscape
- FCL - Future Cities Laboratory

== Degrees ==
The D-ARCH (Departement of Architecture), offers the following degrees:

- Bachelor of Science ETH in Architecture (BSc ETH Arch.)
- Master of Science ETH in Architecture (MSc ETH Arch.)
- Master of Science ETH in Landscape Architecture
- Master of Science ETH Integrated Building Systems
- Doctor of Sciences (Dr. sc. ETH Zürich)
- Master of Advanced Studies:
  - MAS ETH EPFL in Urban and Territorial Design
  - MAS ETH in Architecture and Digital Fabrication
  - MAS ETH in Built Heritage and Repair
  - MAS ETH in Computational Structural Design
  - MAS ETH in Denkmalpflege und Konstruktionsgeschichte
  - MAS ETH in Geschichte und Theorie der Architektur
  - MAS ETH in Housing
  - MAS UPM/ETH in Collective Housing
