= Menz (disambiguation) =

Menz is a province or district of Ethiopia.

Menz may also refer to:

- Menz (surname), a German surname
- Menz Confectionery, an Australian confectionery manufacturer
- Menz Lindsey, American football player and lawyer
