= Ákos Molnár =

Ákos Molnár may refer to:

- Ákos Molnár (swimmer) (born 1987), Hungarian swimmer
- Ákos Molnár (writer) (1893–1945), Hungarian writer
