= List of architecture schools in Switzerland =

This is a list of architecture schools in Switzerland.

== Universities/Swiss Federal Institutes of Technology ==
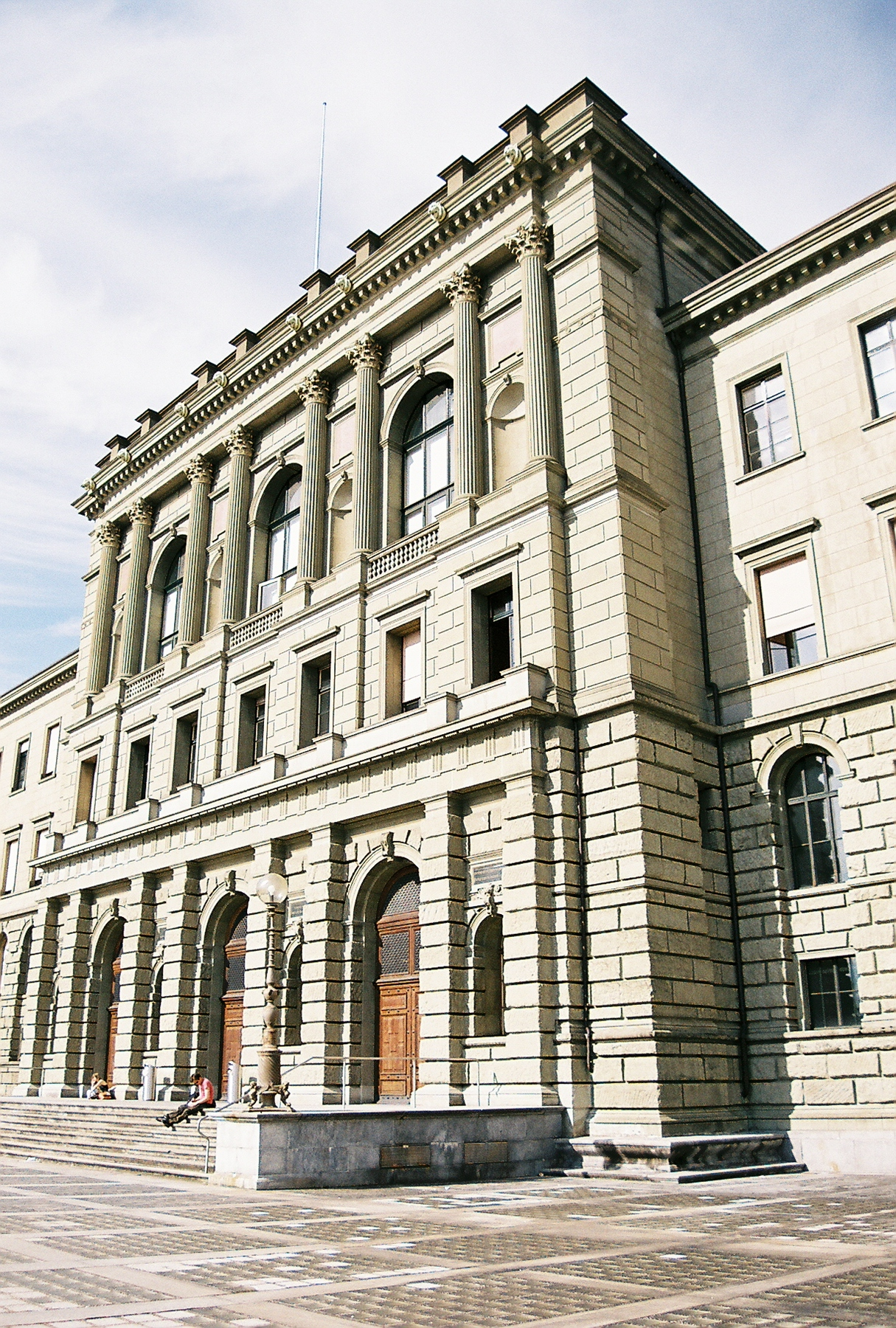
ETH Zurich, since 1854

- ETH Zurich: ETH Zurich Faculty of Architecture (D-ARCH), Zürich, http://www.arch.ethz.ch
- EPFL, École Polytechnique Fédérale de Lausanne, Faculté Environnement, Naturel, Architectural et Construit (ENAC), Section d'architecture (SAR), Lausanne, http://sar.epfl.ch
- University of Lugano (USI), L'Accademia di Architettura di Mendrisio (AAM), http://www.arch.unisi.ch

== Universities of Applied Science ==
- Zurich University of Applied Sciences (ZFH), The School of Architecture, Design and Civil Engineering, Winterthur, https://web.archive.org/web/20121020023630/http://www.archbau.zhaw.ch/
- Berne University of Applied Sciences, Architektur, Holz und Bau, Burgdorf, http://www.bfh.ch
- Lucerne University of Applied Sciences and Arts (Hochschule Luzern – Technik & Architektur, Horw, http://www.hslu.ch
- Fachhochschule Nordwestschweiz, Basel, http://www.fhnw.ch
- Hochschule für Technik Zürich, Zürich, http://www.hsz-t.ch
- Haute École du paysage, d'ingénierie et d'architecture de Genève, Genève, http://hepia.hesge.ch
- Hochschule für Technik und Architektur Freiburg, Fribourg, http://www.eif.ch
- Scuola Universitaria Professionale della Svizzera Italiana (SUPSI), Lugano, http://www.supsi.ch/home.html

== See also ==
- List of largest universities by enrollment in Switzerland
