= Cilicia (ship) =

1988 replica of 13th century merchant ships

Cilicia is a sailing ship built by the Ayas Nautical research club. The ship's design is modeled on existing samples from the 13th century Armenian Kingdom of Cilicia, with extensive reference to manuscripts and illustrations. The ship was built with medieval ship-building techniques. The crew's clothing was also crafted in a medieval style, with methods from the period. During her voyage, Cilicia visited 63 ports in 25 countries in both Europe and Asia.

== History ==
=== Armenia's nautical tradition ===
Armenia has a rich tradition of shipping and shipbuilding, and historical Armenian kingdoms mustered large navies. The 5th-century historian Movses Khorenatsi mentioned that river and lake navigation in Armenia began during the reign of King Artashes I (189–160 BC), who ruled the area between the Black Sea and Caspian Sea.

=== Ayas Nautical Research Club ===
The Ayas Nautical Research Club was founded in 1985, with the goal of studying the history of Armenian shipbuilding and navigation and reviving the traditions of the Armenian Navy. For over 37 years, the club collected historical artifacts and restored more than 26 types of historical Armenian ship.

The club also researches historical facts about shipbuilding, navigation, the navy of Armenia and the Armenian Kingdom of Cilicia. Additionally, the club restores historic ships and conducts underwater archaeological research.

Club members conduct scientific research, publish scholarly works, and participate in various scientific conferences. As noted by Karen Balayan, the president of the Ayas Club:

This historical scientific experiment helped us to glimpse into how our ancestors have navigated and relived the life of sailors living on a medieval ship. It attracted the attention of specialists and the world community because this ship is a sign of unity. This ship is a symbol of the unification of people, cultures, and civilizations.

== Construction ==
In May 1991, the club began the construction of a life-size replica of a 13th-century merchant ship. The ship was named "Cilicia," after the Armenian Kingdom of Cilicia, where the original vessel was built 800 years ago. The ship was constructed using medieval methods. In 2002, the ship was launched on Lake Sevan, where it was tested for about 2 years. In 2004, the ship sailed to Poti, Georgia, beginning its maiden sea voyage—a closed-loop journey around Europe. From 2004 to 2006, Cilicia covered more than 15,000 nautical miles and visited 65 ports in 25 countries. Throughout its voyage, the ship flew the flags of Armenia and the Republic of Artsakh.

The ship was designed to replicate the exact dimensions of merchant sailing ships from the 13th-century Armenian Kingdom of Cilicia. The Ayas Club conducted its research at the Matenadaran Institute of Ancient Manuscripts in Yerevan, as well as in libraries and archives in Moscow, London, and Venice. The ship's structure was recreated based on artistic depictions of historical ships, including Armenian miniatures illustrating scenes from the Bible or Armenian fishing ships. The ship's construction adhered to medieval traditions using historical techniques and materials. Cedar, Oak, and pine were historically used in shipbuilding in the Eastern Mediterranean region, so the Ayas Club chose oak and pine for construction. 13th-century tools were used instead of modern appliances.

The ship's frame is made of oak, creating a dense and solid frame that prevents rotting. The deck and planking are made of pine. The entire ship is treated with vegetable oil mixed with wood resin to prevent decay and wood-boring organisms, in accordance with medieval practices in the Eastern Mediterranean. The ship measures 20 meters in length and 5 meters in width, with a draft of one and a half meters, a displacement of 50 tons, and a sail area of 100 square meters. The crew consists of 12–14 individuals. The construction of the ship spanned 11 years.

== Testing and voyage ==
=== First Tests ===
The first testing occurred on Lake Sevan on May 25, 2002. This marked the ship's inaugural voyage. The ship sailed on Lake Sevan for two years, and during this time, all medieval traditions and conditions were strictly followed, and no modern technologies were used.

=== International voyage ===
In 2004, the ship visited 23 ports across 12 European and Asian countries, sailing from Poti to Venice. In 2005, Cilicia visited 24 ports across 6 countries, reaching the Atlantic and the English Channel before arriving at Portsmouth. In 2006, it visited 18 ports across 20 countries, sailing from St. Petersburg through Russian rivers and channels to reach the Azov and Black Sea. The Cilicia then made it back to Armenia, but by land. Every port the Cilicia visited was connected with a certain historical event.

== Current status ==
From October 2004 to May 2005, the ship was docked on the island of San Lazzaro of the Mekhitarist Congregation in Venice. During its journeys, the boat was visited by different senior officials and famous people, including: the President of Armenia, Catholicos Aram I of Cilicia, Baroness Cox (deputy speaker of the British Parliament), all the mayors of the cities the crew visited during the trip, Dolph Lundgren (actor, director, and producer), and Hrant Dink (editor of “Akos”), among others. There are very few successful cases of building medieval ship replicas. Today, Celicia is located in the Gegharkunik Province of Armenia.
