= Menz (surname) =

Menz is a German surname. It originated as a shortened form of names like Hermann, Mangold and Clemens. Notable people with the surname include:

- Abraham Joseph Menz, an eighteenth century rabbi and mathematician
- Birgit Menz (born 1962), German politician
- Christoph Menz (born 1988), German footballer
- Karl-Heinz Menz (born 1949), German biathlete
- Katharina Menz (born 1990), German judoka
- Sacha Menz (born 1963), Swiss architect

== See also ==
- Menz Lindsey (1897–1961), American football player and lawyer
