= Institute for the History and Theory of Architecture =

Teaching and research institute

Institute for the History and Theory of Architecture (gta), ETH Zurich
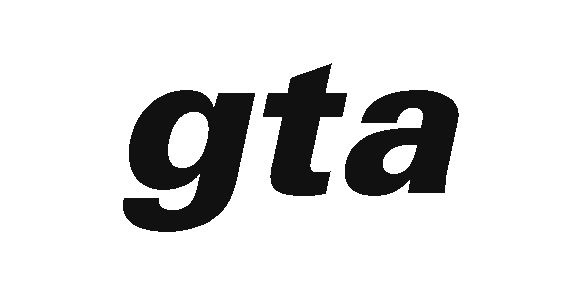
- Established: 1 January 1967; 58 years ago
- Director: Philip Ursprung (director), Laurent Stalder (deputy director)
- Administrative staff: c. 100 (headcount, status May 2017)
- Location: Zürich, Switzerland
- Affiliations: EAHN (European Architectural History Network), icam (international confederation of architectural museums), Docomomo (International Working Party for Documentation and Conservation of Buildings, Sites and Neighbourhoods of the Modern Movement), Werner Oechslin Library Foundation, Bund Schweizer Architekten, ABA-ARCH (Archives et Bibliothèques d’Architecture Suisse), Föderation deutscher Architektursammlungen
- Website: gta.arch.ethz.ch

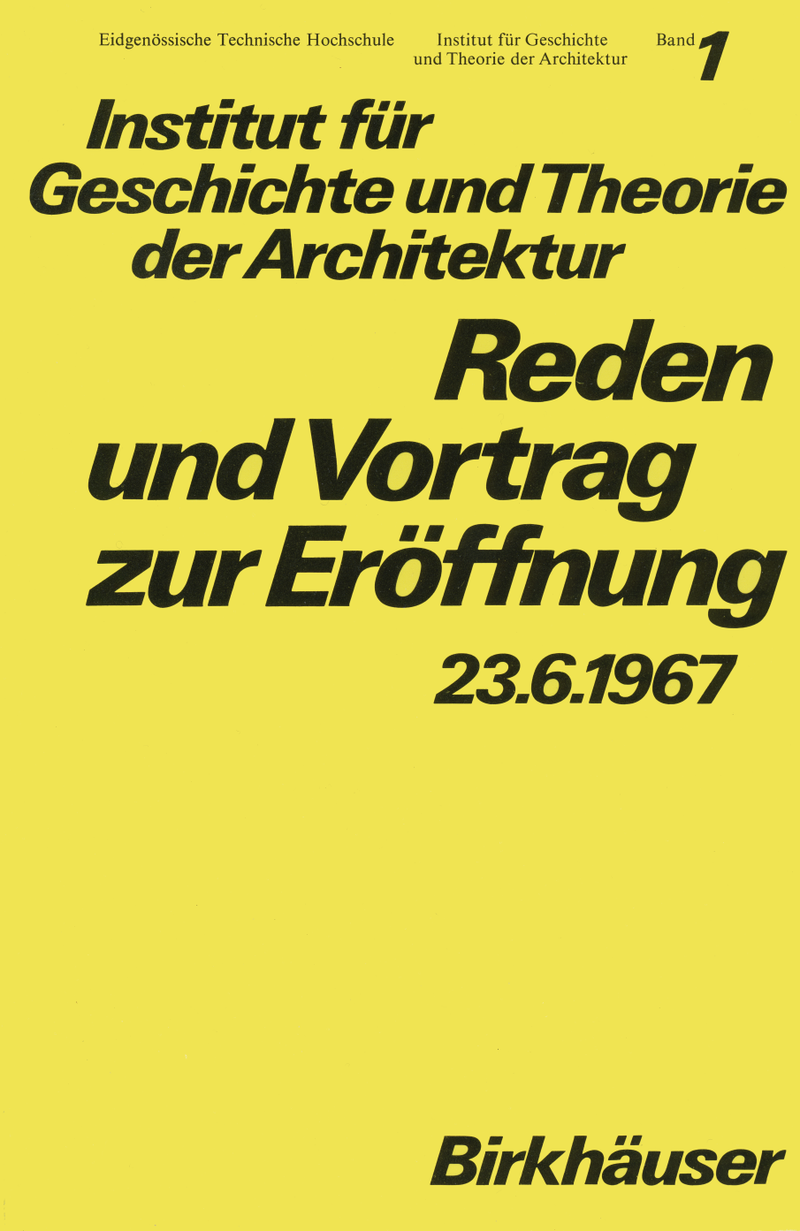
Book cover of Reden und Vortrag zur Eröffnung (Opening Speeches and Lecture)

The Institute for the History and Theory of Architecture (German: Institut für Geschichte und Theorie der Architektur; gta) is a teaching and research institute at the Department of Architecture of ETH Zurich, situated on the ETH Zurich's Hönggerberg Campus site.

== History ==
The Institute for the History and Theory of Architecture (gta) was founded on 1 January 1967 as a research body at the Architecture Department of ETH Zurich. The opening symposium was held on 23 June 1967.

Since its beginnings in 1967, the past and the present, theory and practice, have been the cornerstones and reference framework for the work undertaken at the Institute for the History and Theory of Architecture (gta). Besides teaching activities in the fields of the history of art and architecture, architectural theory and urban design, the institute's core focus since its launch has lain in mediating and exploring architecture in its historical depth and thematic breadth.

The results of the institute's in-house research, which is primarily influenced by the areas of interest of the teaching staff and the holdings of the simultaneously established archive, have been presented since 1968 in a publication series. These first appeared in cooperation with the Birkhäuser publishing house (in the “rainbow series”), later with the Ammann publishing house and since the mid-1980s in the gta Verlag, which today enjoys the reputation of being one of the leading architecture publishers.

The absorption of the so-called Semper Archive from the ETH Bibliothek on the occasion of the creation of the institute forms the foundation of the gta Archives, which over time has advanced to become an internationally renowned research facility.

Since then, the main acquisition emphasis has been on the architecture of the nineteenth century and the pre-modern, modern (Swiss) architecture in the form of collections (Congrès Internationaux d'Architecture Moderne (CIAM)), as well as advance legacies and bequests of individual architects of international stature (including Karl Moser, Hans Bernoulli, Lux Guyer, Haefeli Moser Steiger, Ernst Gisel, Fritz Haller and Trix and Robert Haussmann).

The organisational office for exhibitions by the ETH Zurich's Department of Architecture became incorporated in the institute in 1974, and – since 1986 as gta Exhibitions – affords a wide public insight into contemporary architectural discourse and current research at the department.

=== Institute directors ===
- Adolf Max Vogt (1920–2013), director from 1967 to 1974 and 1981 to 1982
- Bernhard Hoesli (1923–1984), director from 1975 to 1980
- Heinz Ronner (1924–1992), director from 1983 to 1987
- Werner Oechslin (born 1944), director from 1987 to 1998 and 1999 to 2006
- Kurt W. Forster (born 1935), director from 1998 to 1999
- Andreas Tönnesmann (1953–2014), director from 2006 to 2010
- Vittorio Magnago Lampugnani (born 1951), director from 2010 to 2016
- Laurent Stalder (born 1970), director from 2016 to 2021
- Tom Avermaete (born 1971), director from 2021 to 2024
- Philip Ursprung (born 1963) director since 2024

=== Professorial chairs and divisions ===
Today the institute encompasses the following professorial chairs:

- Chair of the History and Theory of Urban Design, Tom Avermaete
- Chair of the History and Theory of Architecture, Maarten Delbeke
- Chair of Theory of Architecture, Laurent Stalder
- Chair of the History of Art and Architecture, Philip Ursprung

The following divisions assist the research projects and convey their findings:

- gta Archives
- gta Verlag
- gta Exhibitions
- gta Digital

The gta Institute assists in the promotion of academic newcomers with its own doctoral programme (since 2012). The institute's educational provisions are supplemented by the programme Master of Studies in the History and Theory of Architecture, which mediates between practice and scholarship (since 1992). There is a close academic exchange with the Werner Oechslin Library Foundation, associated with the ETH Zurich via a cooperation agreement.

== Teaching and research areas ==
The institute's task is to empirically appraise and theoretically reflect upon architecture in its historical depth and ideological breadth. Along with the establishing and verification of facts, the gta Institute has always been at pains to review applied methods in terms of their validity as models and to make them beneficial to contemporary architecture. As an institute, the gta researches and teaches the history of knowledge of architecture, building forms and techniques, the function of architecture and its relations to society and politics, the evolution of design and architectural thinking from the beginnings to today, as well as the methodologies of architectural history work ranging from building analysis through to the digital humanities.
