= Agnes Alpers =

German politician

Member of the Bundestag
- In office 2009–2015

Personal details
- Born: 29 June 1961 (age 64) Oerel, West Germany
- Party: Die Linke

Agnes Alpers (born 29 June 1961) is a Diplom-qualified educator, politician with the Left, and former member of the Bundestag.

== Biography ==
=== Education and career ===
Starting in 1980, Alpers studied pedagogy at the Free University of Berlin, finishing her Diplom degree in 1986. Subsequently, she was active in child welfare. She is a founder of school groups and was the leader of the first Kids Samba Group in Bremen during Carnival. She is married with two children.

After a speech in the Bundestag on 28 June 2013, Alpers collapsed and had to be resuscitated on site. A stroke as a result of an aneurysm was diagnosed, and Alpers was placed into an artificial coma. By the end of July, she was taken out of her coma. In September, she was moved to a hospital in Bremen and is currently undergoing rehabilitation. She handed in her Bundestag mandate effective 2 March 2015 and was succeeded in office by Birgit Menz.

=== Politics ===
Agnes Alpers was a member of the "Socialist Unity Party of West Berlin", which was closely related to the Socialist Unity Party of Germany and the German Communist Party in West Berlin.

From October 2007, Alpers represented the Left in a Bremen "Deputation" (a kind of local parliamentary council) for Education in the Bremen Parliament.

In September 2009, she was elected to the Bundestag (or German Parliament) as part of the Bremen state party list. In parliament, she is a member of the Committee on Education, Research, and Technology. Despite her stroke, Alpers remained the lead candidate on the Bremen state party list and was reelected to the Bundestag in the federal election in 2013.

== Positions ==
Alpers supported a cross-party bill, brought to parliament by a group of over 50 representatives on 8 November 2012, which would limit circumcision for religious purposes for only those who have reached religious maturity (14 years).
