= Langeberg (disambiguation) =

Langeberg is a mountain range in the Western Cape province of South Africa.

Langeberg may also refer to:

- Langeberg Local Municipality, Western Cape, South Africa
- Swen Langeberg or Swen Nater (born 1950), Dutch basketball player

== See also ==
- Langberg, surname
- Langenberg (disambiguation)
