= Langberg =

Langberg is a surname. Notable people with the surname include:

- Ebbe Langberg (1933–1989), Danish actor and film director
- Jesper Langberg (1940–2019), Danish film actor
- Karl Adolf Langberg (1850–1889), Norwegian civil servant and politician.
- Sigurd Langberg (1897–1954), Danish stage and film actor

== See also ==
- Langeberg (disambiguation), includes list of people named Langeberg
