= Ákos Kovács (radiologist) =

Hungarian radiologist

- Kovács Ákos
- Born: 7 April 1903; Budapest, Hungary
- Died: 3 November 1980 (aged 77)
- Scientific career
- Fields: Radiology

Ákos Géza Kovács (7 April 1903 - 3 November 1980) was an internationally renowned Hungarian radiologist.

== Biography ==
After finishing the Medical School of the Pázmány Péter Catholic University in Budapest, Kovács became interested in radiology (a very new diagnostic field at that time), and studied its methods in different laboratories in Hungary and abroad. He was involved in the development of new radiological methods with the aim of overcoming the most important shortcoming of standard plain radiography that produces a single-directional image. His results were published in major international scientific journals of radiology.

Kovács who worked for the St. John's Hospital (1929-1952) and the St. Rokus Hospital (1952-1974) in Budapest, Hungary. He is credited with discovering a new method of X-ray imaging of the lowermost lumbar intervertebral foramen (named after him as the Kovacs method).

== Selected publications ==
- Kovacs, A (1949). "Herniated Disks and Vertebral Ligaments on Native Roentgenograms". Acta Radiologica. 32 (4): 287–303. doi:10.3109/00016924909136238. PMID 15395831.
- Kovacs, A (1950). "X-ray examination of the exit of the lowermost lumbar root". Radiol Clin. 19 (1): 6–13. PMID 15402775.
- Kovacs, A (1955). "Subluxation and Deformation of the Cervical Apophyseal Joints". Acta Radiol. 43 (1): 1–16. doi:10.3109/00016925509172739. PMID 14349741.
- Kovacs, Akos (1956). "Kephalalgia e Subluxatione artic. Cervicalis". Fortschr Roentgenstr. 85 (8): 142–153. doi:10.1055/s-0029-1212960.
- Kovacs, A (1961). "Roentgen Physiology of the Larynx". Acta Radiol. 56 (December): 433–438. doi:10.3109/00016926109172838. PMID 14458912.
- Kovacs, A (1953). "Roentgen therapy of glioma of the eye". Klin Monbl Augenheilkd Augenarztl Fortbild. 122 (1): 43–51. PMID 13053688.
- Kovacs, A (1960). "Asymmetric roentgenography of the vocal chords". Acta Radiol. 53 (June): 426–432. doi:10.3109/00016926009171694. PMID 14411384.
- Kovacs, A (1967). "Roentgenologic study of the laryngeal function in singers". Acta Radiol Diagn. 6 (6): 548–560. doi:10.1177/028418516700600608. PMID 6080080. S2CID 208953517.
- Kovacs, Akos (1974). "Observation of the Cervical Segment of the Spinal Canal by An Extension Device". Acta Radiol. 15 (January): 33–42. doi:10.1177/028418517401500104. PMID 4821723. S2CID 42808278.
