= Birgit Menz =

German politician

Birgit Menz is a German politician of the Left Party who was from 2015 to 2017 a member of the Bundestag.

== Early life and education ==
Menz was born on 16 May 1962 in Suhl, Thuringia and since 1997 lives in Bremen. After visiting a polytechnic secondary school, she trained as a bookseller at a vocational school for bookselling, and graduated from the University of Applied Sciences for Bookselling. She later did various retraining programmes, and thanks to those, she currently works as a clerk in an engineering office.

== Political work ==
Since the age of nineteen, Menz has been active in left-wing party politics, within the Party of Democratic Socialism (later the Left) on the executive committee, in auditing and as treasurer. She was participated in the local initiative "Stephanikreis Ladenschluss" against right-wing extremism, racism and anti-Semitism.

She joined the Bundestag in March 2015 after Agnes Alpers had to resign from the political work due to a stroke she suffered. As part of her parliamentary work, she was Chairwoman of the Parliamentary Advisory Council on Sustainable Development, as well as a full member of the Committee on the Environment, Nature Conservation, Building and Nuclear Safety and a deputy member of the Committee on Transport and Digital Infrastructure and the Committee on Education, Research and Technology Assessment.
