= Josep Lluis Mateo =

Spanish architect

Josep Lluís Mateo
- Born: April 23, 1949, Barcelona
- Education: Polytechnic University of Catalonia and ETSAB
- Website: https://www.mateo-arquitectura.com

Josep Lluís Mateo (born 1949 in Barcelona) is an architect since 1974 (ETSAB - Barcelona High Technical Architectural School).

His work is mostly in Europe with projects built in France, Germany, Portugal, Holland, Croatia and Spain, specializing in quality buildings specifically adapted to a variety of cultural and programmatic conditions.

== Career ==
D. ("Cum Laude") from the UPC (Polytechnic University of Catalonia), 1994.

Professor of Architecture and Design at the ETH-Eidgenössische Technische Hochschule (Swiss Federal Polytechnic of Zurich) since 2002, from where he has directed several architectural researches that have culminated in the edition of publications such as The Four Elements and Architecture: Earth, Water, Air, Fire. Architectural Papers VII (Ed. Actar. Barcelona, 2014). Currently, professor emeritus and member of the steering committee of the Gta (Department of Theory and History).

He has lectured and taught at leading academic and professional institutions around the world, including Harvard University Graduate School of Design, where he was a visiting professor in 2015; Princeton, Columbia University in New York, scholar at the Jean Paul Getty Center in Los Angeles, Cooper Union New York, ABK Stuttgart, UP8 Paris, OAF Oslo, ITESM Mexico or ITT College of Architecture in Chicago.

Member of the Ordre des Architectes of Paris, the Swiss Society of Engineers and Architects (SIA) of Zürich and the Official College of Architects of Catalonia (COAC) of Barcelona.

He directed the publication Quaderns d'Arquitectura i Urbanisme between 1981 and 1990, a period in which the publication was awarded the ACCA (Associació Catalana de Crítica d'Art) 1981; Laus 1985 and Laus ADG 1981; Ciutat de Barcelona (Plastic Arts) 1984; and the prize awarded by the International Union of Architects (UIA) at the Sofia Biennial in 1990.

Its practice, mateoarquitectura, is globally active and in each project tries to connect intellectual and artistic ambition with pragmatism and objectivity. It has been named one of the top 100 architecture firms of 2019 by Domus magazine.
