= Langenberg (Reinhardswald) =

Hill in Hesse, Germany

Coordinates: 51°34′50″N 9°32′12″E

Highest point
- Elevation: 430 m (1,410 ft)

Geography
- Location: Hesse, Germany

Langenberg (German pronunciation: [ˈlaŋənbɛʁk]) is a hill of Hesse, Germany.
