= Ákos Moravánszky =

Swiss-Hungarian architect and historian

- Born: 26 November 1950 (age 75); Székesfehérvár, Hungary
- Occupations: Architecture Historian and Theorist
- Awards: 1989 Award of the Hungarian Department for Education for a publication of high scholarly standard; 2013 Honorary Membership of the Széchenyi Academy of the Arts, Hungarian Academy of Sciences.; 2017 Honorary Doctor (Dr. h.c.) of the Technical University Budapest; 2018 Pro Hungarian Architecture medal of the Association of Hungarian Architects

Academic background
- Education: Budapest University of Technology

Ákos Moravánszky (born 26 November 1950), is a Swiss-Hungarian architect, theorist, historian and Adjunct Professor Emeritus of Architectural Theory at the Institute for the History and Theory of Architecture at the Swiss Federal Institute of Technology in Zürich. Moravánszky is regarded as one of the world's leading architecture historians of Central European architecture.

== Biography ==
Moravánszky studied architecture at the Budapest University of Technology, where he received his diploma in 1974. Subsequently, he worked in Budapest at KÖZTI, an architectural design office specialized for public buildings. In 1977, he started his doctoral studies at the Technical University of Vienna as a Herder-Fellow, receiving his degree in 1980. In 1983 he was appointed editor-in-chief of the architectural journal of the Association of Hungarian Architects, Magyar Épitőművészet. He was invited as an Alexander-von-Humboldt research fellow to the Zentralinstitut für Kunstgeschichte (Central Research Institute for Art History) in Munich (1986–1988). He worked as research associate at the Getty Center in Santa Monica, California (1989–1991) and as Visiting Associate Professor at the Massachusetts Institute of Technology in Cambridge, Massachusetts (1991–1996). Between 1996 and 2016 he was in charge of the Chair of Architectural Theory at the Institute for the History and Theory of Architecture at the ETH Zurich. He taught as a visiting professor at the Moholy-Nagy University of Art and Design in Budapest in 2003/04, at the Universidad de Navarra in Pamplona, Spain, in 2017/18, 2021/22 and at the Faculty of Architecture, University of Ljubljana, Slovenia, in 2020/21. He was invited as a Visiting Researcher at the Politecnico di Milano in 2022 to initiate the cooperative research project Cold War Interactions: Architectural Exchange between Italy and the Socialist East.

== Writings on architecture ==
Moravánszky is especially known for his writing on twentieth-century architecture in Central Europe, and for his role in the development of a theory of materiality in architecture. His books include Competing Visions: Aesthetic Invention and Social Imagination in Central European Architecture, 1867–1918 (1998), which was the first systematic work focusing on the development of architectural modernism in the countries of the Habsburg Empire and its successor states. "Ákos Moravánszky's Competing Visions: Aesthetic Invention and Social Imagination in Central European Architecture 1867-1918 turned modernism into a simple architectural alternative among others" – wrote French architectural historian Carmen Popescu.

Results of this research were published earlier in his books Die Architektur der Donaumonarchie (1988) and Die Erneuerung der Baukunst: Wege zur Moderne in Mitteleuropa (1988). William M. Johnston, an American historian focusing on European cultural history emphasized in his book Zur Kulturgeschichte Õsterreichs und Ungarns 1890–1938 (2015) Moravánszky's pioneering achievement and his "virtuosity in weaving together architectural and intellectual history". An important aspect of Moravánszky's work was the ethnographic research of architects into the material culture of the village, and their interest for vernacular buildings. In August 1996, he organized an international conference at the Internationales Forschungszentrum Kulturwissenschaften in Vienna. The papers of the conference have been published in Moravánszky's edited volume Das entfernte Dorf (2002). The significance of this achievement has been recognized by scholars working later on issues of regionalism and vernacular architecture. The research that started with his doctoral thesis and early writings on the architecture in the Habsburg monarchy, and concluded with the series of conferences East West Central on architecture and urbanism in post-war Europe, held at the ETH Zurich, with particular emphasis on the former Eastern Bloc countries. The results of the conferences have been published in three volumes. Reviewers praised the results as the "re-unification of Europe in architectural history" (András Ferkai in Ars Hungarica) and as "one of the most interesting works dealing with the period" (Michal Janák in docomomo)

The question of materiality was discussed in seminars held at the doctoral school of the Institut gta / ETH Zurich, the Architectural Association in London, the Moholy-Nagy University of Art in Budapest, the Universidad de Navarra in Pamplona, the Politecnico di Milano and the Faculty of Architecture at the University of Ljubljana.

He summed up his stance towards materiality in his book Metamorphism: Material Change in Architecture (2018) as follows: "The interpretation of material outlined in this introduction progresses from constructional principles via cultural meaning to sensory experience. Accordingly, the technical literature is progressively complemented by texts which use the power of material as an argument for a post-human materialism and as a tool for the ecologization of culture. This book is neither a construction handbook nor a work of architectural history, neither a treatise on the iconology of materials nor a plea for a new materialism. By focusing our attention on ideas that have arisen in close connection with the practice of design it seeks to significantly advance the discourse about material. The examination of Semper’s theory and the presentation of theoretical discussions about materiality cannot be separated from the investigation of architectural examples. The identification and recognition of materiality can counter the dematerialization which globalization is leaving in its wake." The English-language and German editions of the book received positive reviews. British architectural historian Adrian Forty commented: "Although primarily for the discipline of architecture, Metamorphism also reaches further, aiming, by looking at architecture, to bridge the gap between material research, with its philosophically unconsidered results, and a theoretical debate about the 'new materialism' where those results are generally ignored." The two editions of his text anthology Architekturtheorie im 20. Jahrhundert. Eine kritische Anthologie was organized around five key concepts of architectural theory and was used as a handbook to his courses in the Theory of Architecture at the ETH Zurich. In 2015, a collection of Moravánszky's writings over a period of over 20 years was collated and published by the gta Verlag with the title Lehrgerüste.

== Notable publications ==
- Antoni Gaudí; Polish ed.: Antoni Gaudí German ed.: Antoni Gaudí
- Die Architektur der Donaumonarchie 1867 bis 1918, Hungarian ed.: Építészet az Osztrák-Magyar Monarchiában
- Die Erneuerung der Baukunst. Wege zur Moderne in Mitteleuropa
- Competing Visions. Aesthetic Invention and Social Imagination in Central European Architecture, 1867–1918; Hungarian ed.: Versengő látomások. Esztétikai újítás és társadalmi program az Osztrák-Magyar Monarchia építészetében, 1867–1918
- Räumlinge. Valentin Bearth & Andrea Deplazes; English ed.: Spacepieces. Valentin Bearth & Andrea Deplazes; Italian ed.: Corpi cavi. Valentin Bearth & Andrea Deplazes
- Architekturtheorie im 20. Jahrhundert. Eine kritische Anthologie. Vienna, New York: Springer, 2003, 2nd revised edition Basel: Birkhäuser, 2015
- Lehrgerüste. Theorie und Stofflichkeit der Architektur, Zürich: gta Verlag, 2015.
- Metamorphism. Material Change in Architecture. German ed.: Stoffwechsel. Materialverwandlung in der Architektur.
- Post Otto Wagner. Von der Postsparkasse zur Postmoderne. From the Postal Savings Bank to Post-Modernism.
