= Ákos Kertész =

Hungarian writer and screenwriter (1932–2022)

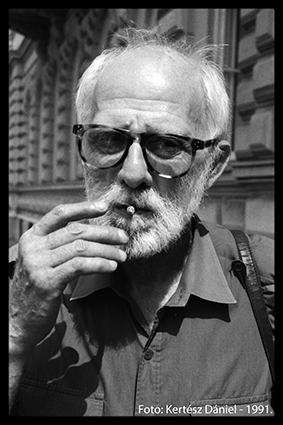
- Kertész in 1991
- Born: 18 July 1932; Budapest, Hungary
- Died: 7 December 2022 (aged 90); Montreal, Quebec, Canada
- Education: Eötvös Loránd University
- Occupations: Writer; Screenwriter

Ákoz Kertész (Hungarian: Kertész Ákos; 18 July 1932 – 7 December 2022) was a Hungarian writer and screenwriter. In 2008, he was awarded the Kossuth Prize for high literary honors in Hungary.

== Biography ==
Born in Budapest on 18 July 1932 to Jewish parents Ferenc Kertész and Lilla Vágó, he narrowly escaped the Holocaust.

After attending secondary school in Budapest, Kertész was not admitted to university due to his Jewish ancestry and instead worked in an automobile factory for Ikarus. He studied at Eötvös Loránd University from 1961 to 1966, graduating with a degree in Hungarian folk studies. From 1966 to 1992, he worked as a screenwriter for Mafilm. He published his first book in 1962, titled Hétköznapok szerelme.

From 1994 to 1997, Kertész was an editor for the weekly magazine Élet és Irodalom. On 29 August 2011, he wrote an open letter to the Hungarian newspaper Amerikai Magyar Népszava detailing his harassment. On 29 February 2012, he applied for asylum in Canada, which was granted in November 2013.

Kertész died in Montreal on 7 December 2022, at the age of 90.

== Works ==
- Hétköznapok szerelme (1962)
- Sikátor (1965)
- Makra (1971)
- Névnap (1972)
- Witwen (1976)
- Vdovy (1976)
- Jmeniny (1978)
- Kasparek (1979)
- Családi ház manzárddal (1982)
- Aki mer, az nyer (1984)
- Huszonegy (1984)
- A világ rendje (1984)
- Gimenes māja ar mansardu (1987)
- Makura (1988)
- Zakariás (1990)
- Másnaposság (1990)
- A gyűlölet ára (1992)
- Tündérmesék (1999)
- A tisztesség ára (2000)
- Zé és más történetek (2000)
- Még a kapanyél is elsülhet (2001)
- Brúnó, Borcsa, Benjámin… (2004)
- A Nap utcai fiúk (2006)
- A romazsaru (2009)
- Égszakadás, földindulás : napló miniatúrák : kisesszék és publicisztikai írások (2009)
- Még a kapanyél is elsülhet (2010)
- Zakariás (2010)
- Tigrisbunda (2011)
- Jónás Ninivében: publicisztikák (2011)
