= Silke Langenberg =

Swiss-German architect and professor

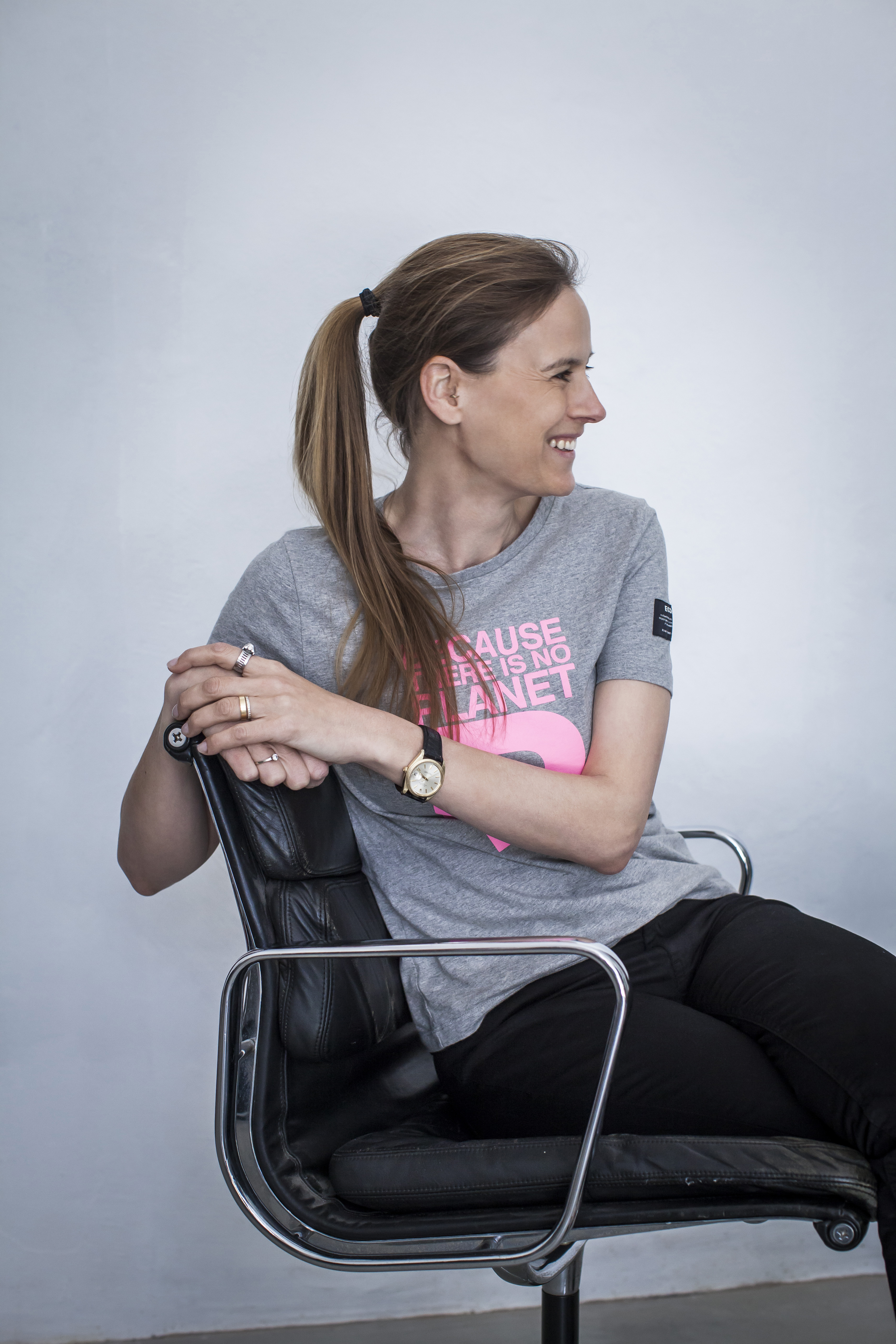
- Silke Langenberg (2020)
- Born: 1974 (age 51–52)
- Education: University of Dortmund, IUAV
- Scientific career
- Fields: Heritage science, Architecture
- Workplaces: ETH Zurich

Silke Langenberg is a Swiss heritage scientist and architect. She is a full professor of construction heritage and preservation in the department of architecture at ETH Zurich.

== Education and career ==
Langenberg studied architecture at the University of Dortmund and at the IUAV. She worked as a research assistant at the Chair of Preservation and Building Research, University of Dortmund, where she was awarded a doctoral degree with a thesis in engineering sciences. From 2006 to 2014, she was a researcher at ETH Zurich. Between 2011 and 2013, she visited the Singapore-ETH Centre for Global Environmental Sustainability multiple times as researcher in residence. In 2014, she took over the professorship for Building in Existing Contexts, Preservation and Building Research at the University of Applied Sciences in Munich. The 1 August 2020 she returned to ETH Zurich to assume the second full professorship at the Institute for Preservation and Construction History at ETH Zurich.

In the discussion on the recognition and preservation of the architecture of the 1960s and 1970s, Silke Langenberg emphasised early on the necessity of taking engineering aspects into account. In connection with her research on system buildings, she addressed in particular the intrinsic conflict between the underlying concept of a building and the material preservation of its original substance. On this basis, she introduced the concept of “transformation value” into the heritage-theoretical debate in 2023. Her research includes attempts to rationalize building processes as well as questions of the development, repair, recognition and long-term preservation of serially, industrially and digitally produced constructions.

In 2014, she initiated a course on repair with students at the Munich University of Applied Sciences in cooperation with the local Fablab and Haus der Eigenarbeit. The results of this collaboration were widely published and exhibited, and consecutively adopted by various academic institutions throughout Germany and Switzerland.

She was a member of the initiative committee for the establishment of the German Research Programme "Construction as Cultural Heritage". As a response to questions discussed within this framework, she named her professorship "Construction Heritage and Preservation" and thus founded a distinct field of research and concept at ETH Zurich, which engages with the recognition and dissemination of innovations in the building process, construction methods and technology. As a result, her professorship is affiliated with both the Institute for Preservation and Construction History and the Institute for Technology in Architecture at ETH Zurich. Silke Langenberg is a member of the Swiss Society of Engineers and Architects (SIA Zurich Section), an associated member of the Federation of Swiss Architects (BSA) and numerous other scientific professional associations.
