= Sacha Menz =

Swiss architect and academic

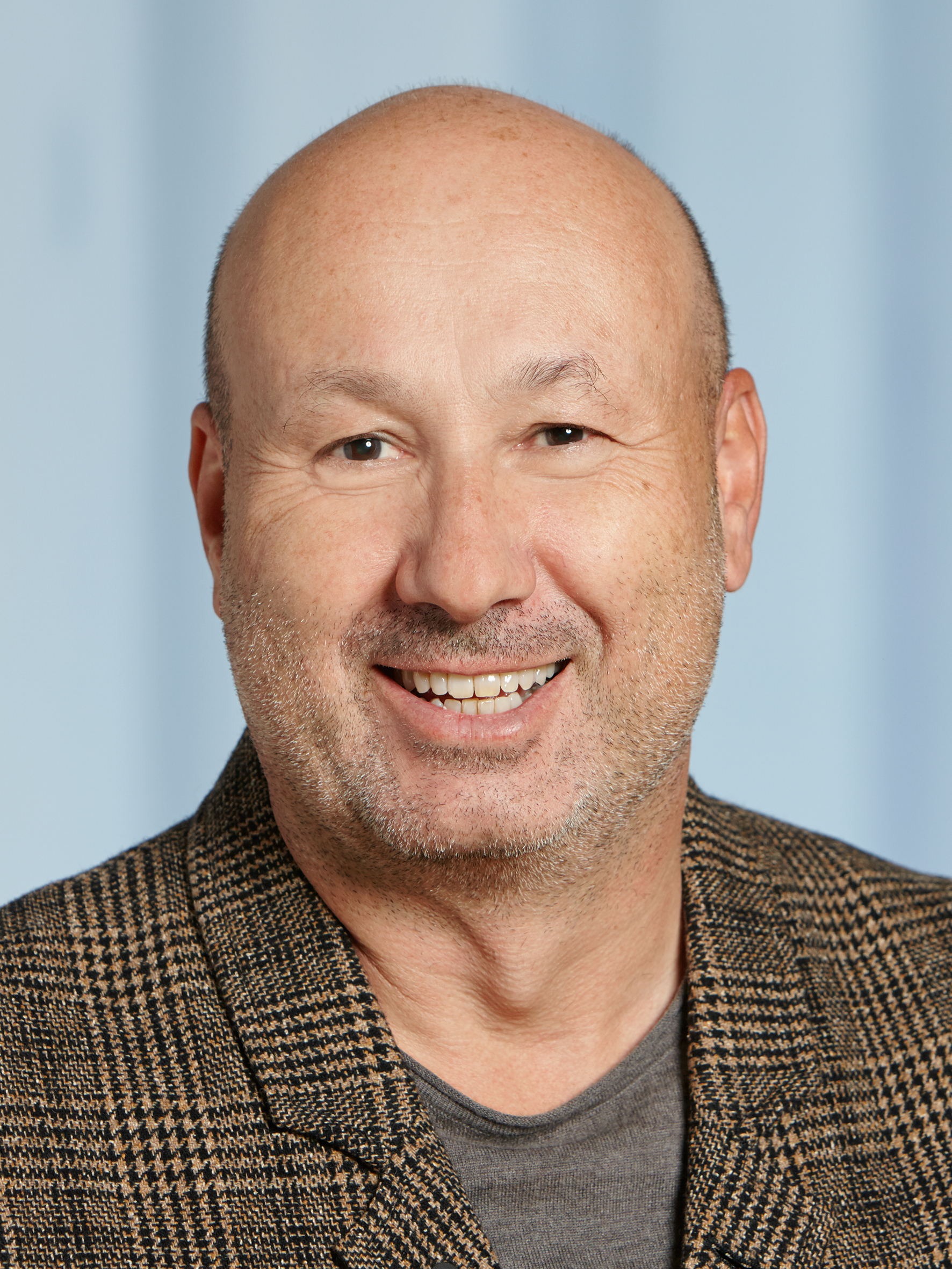
Sacha Menz (2020)

Sacha Leo Cornel Menz (born 25 May 1963 in Vienna, Austria) is a Swiss architect, co-founder of sam architects, full professor at the Swiss Federal Institute of Technology in Zurich (ETH Zurich), former Dean of the Department of Architecture (D-ARCH) and co-founder of the Institute of Technology in Architecture (ITA) at ETH-Zurich.

== Origin and Education ==
Sacha Menz comes from the Bozen (Italy) merchant family Menz. Since 1753 descendents of the Menz have been residing in an important patrician house in Bozen, the listed Menz Palace. Menz has been living in Switzerland since 1972. He studied architecture at ETH Zurich and graduated in 1989 under Professor Dolf Schnebli.

== Academic career ==
Since October 1, 2004, Menz has been the Full Professor of Architecture and Building Process at ETH Zurich where he assumes the responsibilities of both teaching and research. From 2009 to 2017 Menz was the Head of the newly founded Institute of Technology in Architecture (ITA) at ETH Zurich and initiator of the new building "Arch_Tec_Lab" at ETH Zurich. From 2011 to 2015 Menz was also the Dean and the Vice-Dean of the Department of Architecture (DARCH) at ETH Zurich. Since 2009, Menz has been in charge of the Master of Advanced Studies programme (MAS ETH GPB), including Overall Project Leadership, Company Management for Architects and Engineers (UFAI) and Digitalisation (DIGITAL). He acts as the Director of the ETH-Hub for the Future Cities Lab Global (FCL-Global).

== Research ==
His research interests are mainly in the entire planning and building processes, in urban and constructive economic aspects, as well as in the organization of stakeholders and the integration of sustainability goals. Menz has initiated and led many multidisciplinary research projects. He was the Associate Director of the National Centre of Competence in Research in Digital Fabrication (NCCR) at ETH Zurich from 2014 to 2015. He was the Principal Investigator of Module X (Housing) at the Future Cities Laboratory (FCL 1.0) in Singapore from 2012 to 2015, and the Co-Principal Investigator of Dense and Green Building Typologies at the Future Cities Laboratory (FCL 2.0) in Singapore from 2015 to 2019. Since 2019 Menz acts as the Co-Director of the Future Cities Laboratory (FCL Global). In 2019 Menz developed a digital atlas, a tool called MAP (Methodical Application for Planning and Building Process). Since 2020 he is Co-Director of the newly established Future Cities Laboratory Global (FCL G).

== Architect activity ==
After graduating from the Department of Architecture at ETH Zurich in 1989, Menz began to work with Professor Dolf Schnebli, Tobias Ammann and Professor Flora Ruchat-Roncati. In 1990 Menz became a co-founder of Sacha Menz and Kuno Schumacher Architects in Zurich. From 1991 to 1997 he founded Joran Sport AG for high-quality bicycle design and production. Since 1997 Menz has been the co-owner of the architecture firm sam architects and partners in Zurich, Switzerland. The office has around forty employees. In 1997 Menz was also a co-founder of the real estate company Staub Holding AG in Switzerland. In the last twenty years, Menz has been participating in various architecture juries. Since 2002 he has also been a permanent member of the Architectural Advisory Board of the City of Ostfildern (Baden-Württemberg, Germany).

== Selected Projects ==
- Residential development Villago, Männedorf
- Mixed-use development Trio Dietikon, Dietikon
- Community-hall, Männedorf
- Swiss Re Pavillon, Adliswil
- Vorderer Sternen Restaurant, Zürich
- Richti-Areal Site III, Wallisellen, Zürich
- FIFA World Football Museum, Zürich
- Tgiesa Crapera, Lenzerheide
- Residential development Villavista, Brissago
- Klubhaus Swiss Re, Zürich
- Community-hall, Vals
- EMPA Campus, Dübendorf-Zürich
- Police Headquarters, Aarau

== Social Contribution and Activities ==
Menz participated in various national and international committees. In 2002 he joined the Board of Schweizerischer Ingenieur- und Architektenverein (SIA). He worked as the president of the Zurich section in SIA from 2005 to 2011. Since 2004 he is also a member of Federation of Swiss Architects (BSA). From 2008 to 2011 he was a board member of Future Buildings Platform which is a research platform for sustainable construction technologies. From 2015 to 2018 he joined the Board of Directors of SIA. He founded Network Digital Switzerland in 2016. Menz participants as a member in the Review Board for Clusters of Excellence of German Research Foundation (DFG) since 2017 and attends the Strategy Commission of ETH Zurich since 2019.

== Selected publications ==
- Sacha Menz, Teure Mängel beim Bau, in: NZZ am Sonntag, 1. April 2012, S. 41.
- Sacha Menz und Oliver Kriebus (Hg.), Mängel im Hochbau, Empfehlungen für Ausführende und Entscheidungsträger, Zürich 2013, ISBN 978-3-9524170-6-5.
- Sacha Menz, Drei Bücher über den Bauprozess, 2. Auflage, Zürich 2014, ISBN 978-3-7281-3599-5.
- Sacha Menz, Public Space Evolution in High-Density Living in Singapore, Singapur 2015, ISBN 978-3-03-304796-9.
- Sacha Menz, Vision: Kollaborativ forschen und entwickeln, in: Sonderheft TEC21, 16. September 2016, S. 8.
- Sacha Menz und Thomas Schröpfer (Hg.), Dense and Green Building Typologies Research, Policy and Practice Perspectives, Singapur 2018, ISBN 978-981-13-0712-6.
- Sacha Menz, Abkühlung nach dem Hitzesommer, in: Werk, Bauen + Wohnen, 13. September 2019.
- Sacha Menz, Dense and Green Building Typologies: Architecture as Urban Ecosystem in: Future Cities Laboratory Indicia 02, Singapur 2019, S. 32–42, ISBN 978-3-03778-599-7.
- Sacha Menz und Isabelle Heide (Hg.), Professionell vernetzt, in: TEC21, Nr. 9-10, 8. März 2019, S. 15.
- Sacha Menz, Collective Power of the Single Building in: Dense and Green Cities: Architecture as Urban Ecosystem, Basel 2020, S. 38–51, ISBN 978-3-0356-1531-9.
