= Ákos Molnár (writer) =

Hungarian writer (1893–1945)

- Molnár Ákos
- Born: December 10, 1893; Budapest
- Died: February 1945 (aged 49); Budapest
- Occupation: writer
- Writing career
- Language: Hungarian
- Genres: novel, short story
- Subjects: bourgeoisie, history
- Notable awards: Mikszáth Award

Ákos Molnár (December 10, 1893 – February 1945) was a Hungarian writer.

== Life ==
Ákos Molnár was born on December 10, 1893, in Budapest, into a middle-class Hungarian Jewish family. He was learning to become a violinist but lost one of his arms in World War I and got shell shock. At first, Molnár supported his writing by working as a bank employee. Later, he focused exclusively on writing.

His works mostly deal with the bourgeoisie, either based on his own experiences, or using historical figures. His style is vivid and light. One of his novels, Végre egy jó házasság, was awarded with a Mikszáth Award in 1929. Nyugat and Népszava published some of his works. A császár dajkája—another one of his novels, a deviation both in style and in topic—covers the life of Katalin Varga, the leader of the 1840s Transylvanian miners' movement. Molnár's novel which received the most editions during his lifetime is A hitehagyott, about Imre Fortunatus. Some of his works were translated into French, Portuguese, and German.

In February 1945, German soldiers dragged him and his wife from their home and executed them.

After his death, his works were not published again until 1963, when a collection of short stories, tilted Jóslat, became available. Next, some of his novels were republished starting from 2005.

== Bibliography ==
- Gyereknek lenni (short stories, 1926)
- Végre egy jó házasság (novel, 1929)
- Jóslat (seven short stories, 1932)
- Tizenkét lépés (novel, 1933)
- A császár dajkája (novel, 1935)
- A hitehagyott (novel, 1937)
- Szabadulás (novel, 1941)
