= Luděk Sekyra =

Czech entrepreneur (born 1964)

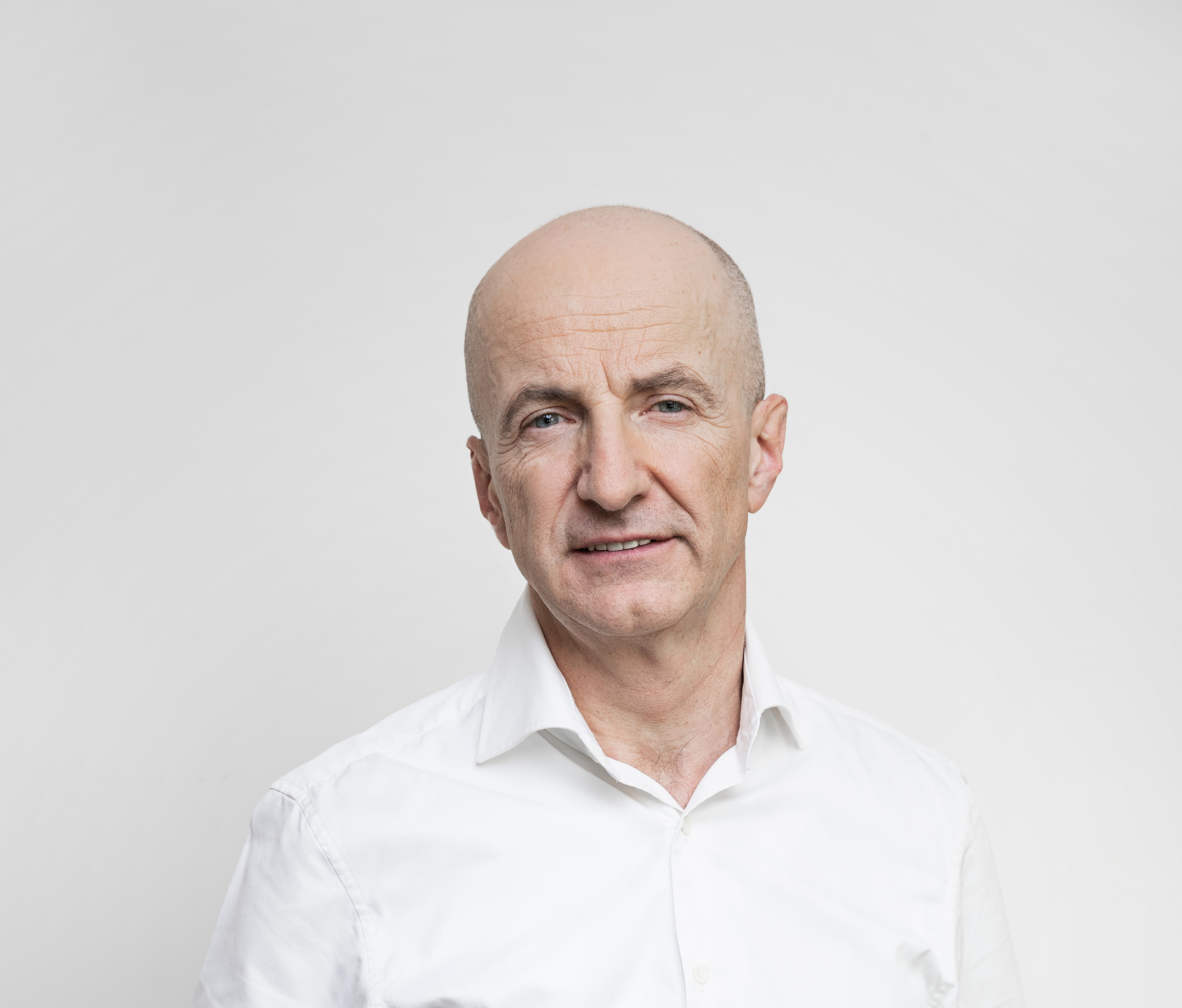
- Sekyra in 2017
- Born: February 8, 1964 (age 62); Český Krumlov, Czechoslovakia
- Education: Faculty of Law, Charles University
- Occupation: Entrepreneur
- Political party: KDU-ČSL
- Spouse: Věra Sekyrová Terezijská
- Children: 2

Luděk Sekyra (born 8 February 1964) is a Czech entrepreneur and philanthropist. He is the owner of the Sekyra Group, which has operated on the Czech real estate market since 1996 and focuses on the residential and commercial sectors. Cyprus-based companies controlled by Sekyra have stakes in several major real estate development projects in Prague including Smíchov City, Rohan City, and Žižkov City. Luděk Sekyra is the founder and chairman of the board of the Sekyra Foundation.

Forbes magazine included Luděk Sekyra to the list of billionaires, which makes him 33rd richest Czech with an estimated net worth of 21 billion Czech koruna, which is approximately US$1.01 billion.

== Career ==
Born in Český Krumlov, after graduation from a secondary school in Kaplice he was admitted to Faculty of Law, Charles University in Prague. He became an official of Socialist Youth Union and a member of Communist Party of Czechoslovakia. On 13 November 1989 communist daily Rudé právo printed on its front page a group photo of Socialist Youth Union officials including Sekyra. From 1987 to 1990, he worked as a teacher at the Charles University Faculty of Law and studied theory of state and politics and legal theory.

After the Velvet Revolution he became a partner in the law office of professor Milan Bakeš, where he focused on restitutions of real estate seized by the communists after coup d'état in 1948. In July 1992 Sekyra co-founded a real estate agency and gradually became involved as developer and investor in several real estate projects, including refurbishments of pre-fabricated paneláks. In April 1999 he named his real-estate development company SEKYRA Group.

Following the dampened construction after the 2008 financial crisis, Sekyra restarted several large projects in 2014, gained first rubber stamps and approvals for Rohanský Island in Prague and for the resumption of its Prague-Modřany project. The group has built the headquarters for companies such as Česká spořitelna, Nestlé, T-Mobile and Skanska. The Sekyra Group has also built or renovated about 7,000 flats. Fifteen years ago the Sekyra Group entered the public buildings segment with a project for the Czech National Technical Library. Upon completion in 2009, the library won the award for Building of the Year and the Best of Realty jury prize.

In 2007 Sekyra transferred his share in Sekyra Group a.s. to Netherlands-based company SEKYRA GROUP REAL ESTATE N.V. (SGRE). At the end of December 2007 Luděk Sekyra controlled Curaçao-based company CEE Holdings N.V., which had a 95% stake in SGRE. Sekyra's companies have contracts to develop major real-estate projects in the country's capital, Prague. These include Rohan Island, Smíchov Railway Station, Žižkov Railway Station, Victory Square in Dejvice and Litochleby Square in Opatov.

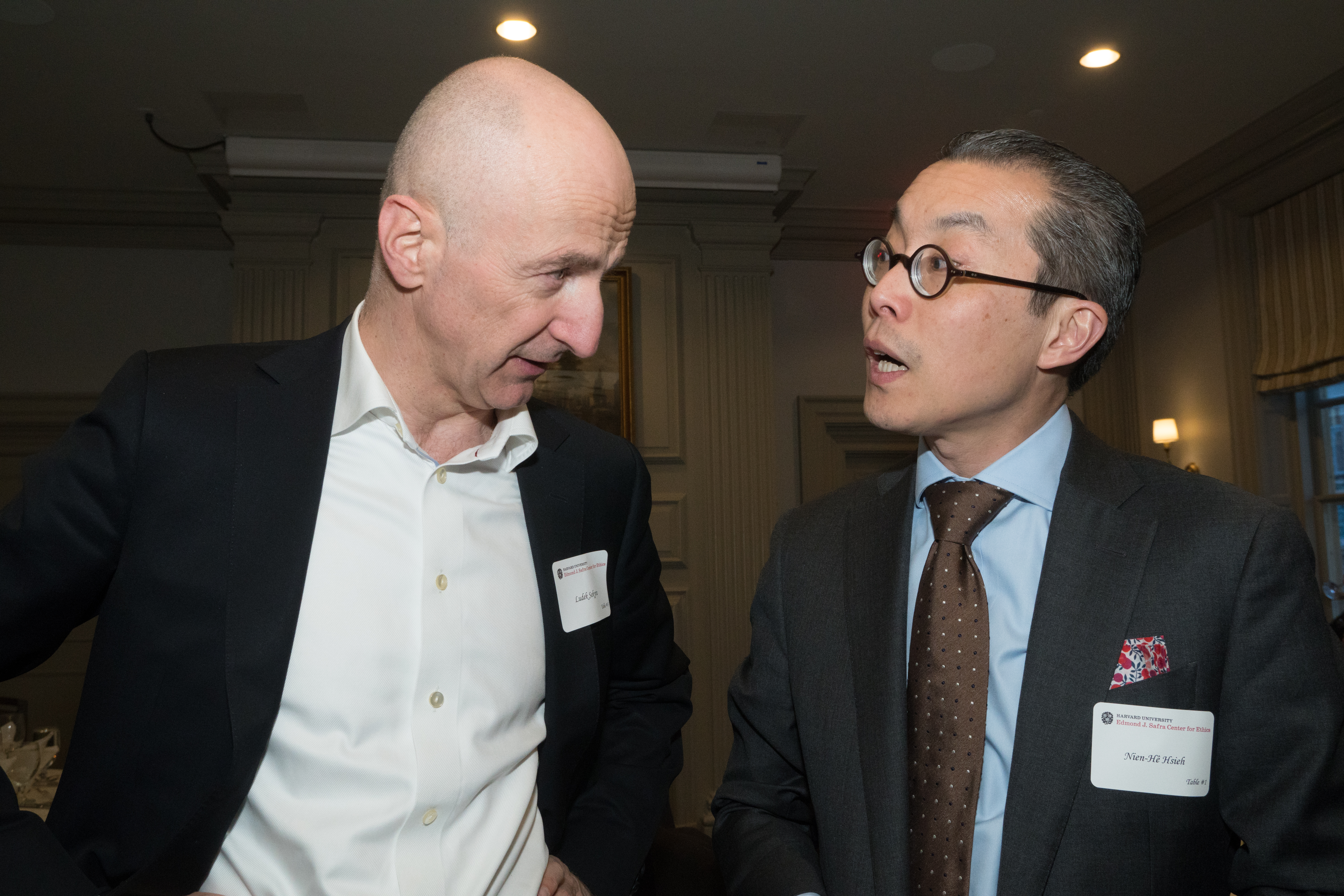
Sekyra with Harvard professor Nien-he Hsieh in 2018.

=== Current Projects ===
The Sekyra Group's current projects include new neighborhoods in central locations of Prague: the areas of the Smíchov train station (Smíchov City), Rohan Island (Rohan City), the Žižkov train station (Žižkov City), Vítězné Náměstí in Dejvice, and more near the main road of Opatov in Prague's Jižní Město.

Smíchov City is the largest project in the modern history of Prague. The project will include almost 400,000 m2 of residential, administrative, commercial, and public space including a kilometer-long pedestrian boulevard that will serve as the focal point of the entire project. There will also be a school and extensive green space. After the project is completed, in 12 years, 12,000 people are expected to live or work there. Total investment will reach 35 billion CZK. Construction began on September 30, 2020.

The new neighborhood of Rohan City is located at the borders of Karlín, Invalidovna, and Libeň in the vicinity of the city's historic center. The project will include more than 350 thousand square meters of residential, administrative, and commercial space, as well as a public school. The project's focal point will be a kilometer-long promenade along the riverbank, which will be connected to a recreational island. The overall design of the project saw contributions from world-famous Danish urban designer Jan Gehl and architect Eva Jiřičná. The four residential buildings and the adjacent square were designed by architect Daniel Libeskind.

The residential neighborhood of Žižkov City will offer 3,000 apartments on the location of the former freight railway station. At the same time, the historical station building will be revitalized in collaboration with the city of Prague, giving it a predominantly public function including the National Film Archive.

== Charity and political philosophy ==
Luděk Sekyra is a long-time active philanthropist. He helped create the Centre for Philosophy, Ethics, and Religion at Charles University, and in September 2018, he founded the Sekyra Foundation whose first members of the board (chaired by L. Sekyra) are Jiří Pehe, Michael Žantovský, Jiřina Šiklová, Tomáš Halík, Daniel Kroupa, and Martin Palouš. Members of its international board are for example Mark Thompson, Grzegor Ekiert, Alexander Görlach and Karolina Wigura. The goal of the foundation is to support the development of civil society, liberal democracy, and critical thinking. In 2021 an Oxford professorship in moral philosophy has renamed for Sekyra and White's Professorship of Moral Philosophy in recognition of the Sekyra Foundation's £2.8 million donation. He has been a member of the advisory board of the Safra Center for Ethics at Harvard since 2023. In 2025 he became a member of the American Philosophical Association (APA).

=== Cooperation with the University of Oxford ===
The foundation has established long-term collaborations with Harvard and Oxford Universities, the Václav Havel Library, the Czech Center of the International PEN Club, and the Centre for Philosophy, Ethics, and Religion at the Charles University Faculty of Arts. The foundation focuses on the development of critical and philosophical thinking, on the support of academic institutions and educational projects, including the publication of works by important thinkers. The foundation's mission is also to strive for intergenerational dialogue in the context of responsibility for the future of the planet.

Sekyra has long worked with Oxford University and is a member of Harris Manchester College's Board of Regents and a Foundation Fellow.

Luděk Sekyra cooperates with Oxford University on a long-term basis. In 2011, Sekyra became one of the 36 members of Harris Manchester College's board. On November 6, 2014, University of Oxford hosted a series of events called Velvet Day as a commemoration of 25th anniversary of the Velvet Revolution in the Czech Republic and its former president, Václav Havel. Among the main events were Havel's Place instalment and its revelation in the university park and inauguration of Sekyra House student center at the university and became a member of its Vice Chancellor Circle. Oxford's Velvet Day celebration included the naming of a lecture hall in Sekyra House in honor of Czech theologian and priest Tomáš Halík and the unveiling of Havel's Place in the university's main park. Luděk Sekyra's primary academic interests are moral and political philosophy. His essays have been published by Hospodářské noviny, and Lidové noviny.

On November 6, 2014, University of Oxford hosted a series of events called Velvet Day as a commemoration of 25th anniversary of the Velvet Revolution in the Czech Republic and its former president, Václav Havel. Among the main events were Havel's Place instalment and its revelation in the university park, and also the inauguration of the student centre Sekyra House, sponsored by Luděk Sekyra. One of its lecture halls was named after the Czech theologian and priest Tomáš Halík.

=== Sekyra and White's Professor of Moral Philosophy ===
In 2021 an Oxford professorship in moral philosophy was endowed following a £2.8 million donation from the Luděk Sekyras foundation. The White's Chair of Moral Philosophy was Oxford's first professorial post in philosophy when it was established 400 years ago. It has become the Sekyra and White's Professorship of Moral Philosophy in recognition of the Sekyra Foundation's gift.

=== The Czech Center of the International PEN Club ===
The Sekyra Foundation supported the Czech PEN Club in 2020 and also supports it in 2021. The Czech Center of the International PEN Club is part of the independent PEN world community with headquarters in London. They associate around twenty thousand creators - people who are figuratively reigning with a pen (PEN - Playwrights, Poets, Essayists, Novelists).

=== Václav Havel Library ===
Through the Sekyra Foundation Sekyra cooperates with the Václav Havel Library, which spreads and protects the intellectual, literary, and political legacy of one of the greatest figures“ figure of modern Czech history – writer, playwright, thinker, fighter for human rights, and Czechoslovak and Czech President Václav Havel. For the general public, the Václav Havel Library offers a number of seminars, author readings, debates, concerts, and theatre performances. The Library also organizes a conference in honor of the Laureate of the Václav Havel Human Rights Prize, in which the Foundation will participate. Sekyra Foundation is supporting the library since 2016.

=== Central European Forum ===
The Foundation regularly supports the annual Central European Forum, which takes place each year in Bratislava. The Forum connects contemporary social scientists, writers, journalists, artists, and young civic leaders from Europe and the rest of the world with the general public. The debates are focused on topics such as democracy and the most challenging aspects of freedom. Sekyra is supporting the Forum since 2018.

Through his holding, Sekyra is also one of the main sponsors of the Czech Christian Academy. During the 2018 Czech presidential election he supported Jiří Drahoš.

=== Kultura Liberalna ===
In 2019 Sekyra The Foundation initiated its cooperation with Kultura Liberalna, a Polish NGO and liberal think tank. Its mission is to create a better Europe by renewing liberalism and stressing the importance of the rule of law, pluralism, and freedom and dignity for every individual. The Foundation supported a Conference titled “Two Visions of Europe: What Sources of Hope for the Future?”, Part of the Cracking Borders, Rising Walls series, which brings together a set of panelists from the ranks of academia and international media and encouraging the broader public to participate in the discussions as well.

== Awards ==
In 2005, Luděk Sekyra was named Personality of the Year in the Best of Realty competition and received an award from the Association for Real Estate Market Development.

For the National Library of Technology building in Prague, his company received several major awards in 2009, including an award from the Mayor of Prague “The Building of the Year”, an award from the State Environmental Fund of the Czech Republic for infrastructure, and other awards for the graphic design as well as the architectural and technical solution.

== Controversies ==
In 2007, Luděk Sekyra, together with the businessman Roman Janoušek, who has been under investigation regarding allegations of tender-rigging and bribery, spent a holiday in Sardinia, Italy. An invoice from the time demonstrates that Sekyra fully covered the expenses for the trip.

In 2000 Sekyra's SPV company "Středoevropská stavební" (StS) acquired major Czech construction company IPS. Sekyra secretly joined forces with infamous entrepreneur and lobbyist František Mrázek, often referred to as the "Godfather of Czech Organized Crime", and who was at the time wiretapped by the police. The police also got court-approval to wiretap Sekyra and found out that Ivan Langer, a vice-chairman of the parliament and vice-chairman of the Civic Democratic Party (ODS), is secretly lobbying on StS' behalf. StS made the highest bid for IPS and on 29 February 2000 got a CZK 2,2 bn loan from Investiční a poštovní banka (IPB). However, the loan was just for one month, not the nine years originally discussed. On 28 March IPB decided not to prolong the loan, however, it did not immediately seize the IPS shares pledged as collateral and on 13 April 2000 Luděk Sekyra became chairman of the board of directors of IPS. On 16 June 2000 IPB went into forced administration and StS was forced to transfer the shares to its rival Skanska. On 20 July 2000 Skanska replaced statutory bodies of IPS.
