= Sekyra Foundation =

Czech-based private foundation

The Sekyra Foundation
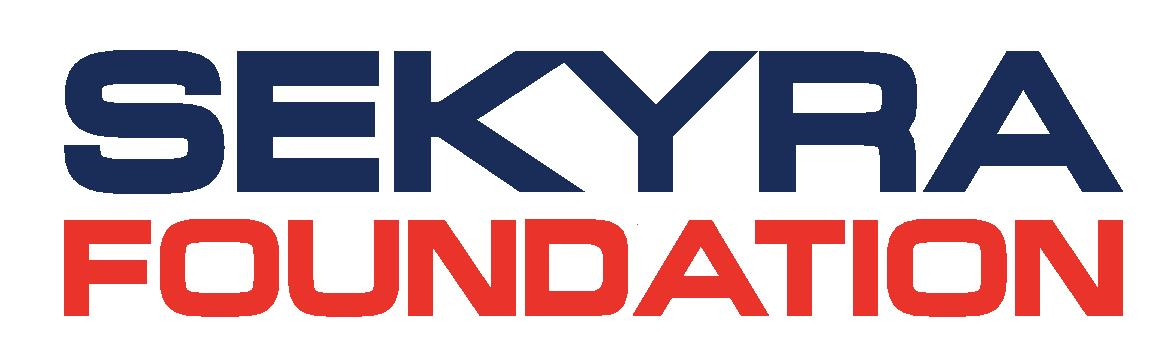
- Established: July 31, 2018; 8 years ago
- Founder: Luděk Sekyra
- Founded at: Prague
- Legal status: Foundation
- Location: U Sluncové 666/12A, Karlín, 186 00, Prague
- Chairman: Luděk Sekyra
- Board of Governors: Tomáš Halík, Michael Žantovský, Jiří Pehe, Martin Palouš, Daniel Kroupa
- Board of Supervisors: Barbara Havelková, Václav Štětka, Petr Fischer, Petr Pithart
- International Advisory Board: Mark Thompson, Mark Malloch-Brown, Grzegorz Ekiert, Jacques Rupnik, Alexander Görlach, Karolina Wigura, Ivan Krastev, Marta Šimečková, Jeff McMahan, Michael Rosen
- Website: https://www.sekyrafoundation.com/en/

The Sekyra Foundation is a private foundation created in 2018 by Czech entrepreneur Luděk Sekyra in support of moral universalism, liberal values, and civil society. Among many other projects the Foundation has a long-term cooperation with the University of Oxford which has also named the oldest statutory professorship in philosophy at Oxford after the foundations founder Luděk Sekyra.

== Purpose ==
The foundation is focused on support for civil society, the development of critical and philosophical thought, support for academic institutions and educational projects, sustainable development and protection of the environment, lectures, and publishing the works of important thinkers. Another mission of the foundation is the defense of political freedom, human rights, and cultural and religious diversity. In collaboration with leading universities around the world and Europaeum, the foundation is cultivating the legacy of key philosophers of the 20th century like John Rawls and Ludwig Wittgenstein, as well as intellectuals associated with Central and Eastern Europe, such as Isaiah Berlin, Leszek Kołakowski, Jan Patočka, and Karl Popper.

The Sekyra Foundation offers month-long stays at the University of Oxford for students at Charles University in Prague and reciprocal stays for English students in Prague. The renovated building of Sekyra House, part of Oxford's Harris Manchester College, had its opening ceremony on November 6, 2014, to commemorate the anniversary of the Velvet Revolution and contains student housing as well as three study halls. Also in the building is a lecture hall named for Tomáš Halík. Luděk Sekyra is a member of the board of Harris Manchester College and one of its Foundation Fellows, as well as a member of Oxford's Vice-Chancellor's Circle and the Aristotelian Society in London.

== Past projects ==
Sekyra Foundation and Luděk Sekyra himself has a long-term cooperation with the University of Oxford. The foundation, whose international efforts focus on supporting philosophy, has provided support for the oldest statutory professorship in philosophy at Oxford, the White's Professorship of Moral Philosophy, which is also the most significant chair of moral philosophy in the world. The professorship was established in 1621 by Thomas White, and after 400 years got a new name Sekyra and White's Professorship of Moral Philosophy.

The Sekyra Foundation has supported several projects for the development of philosophical and intellectual dialogue, including “Jan Patočka and the Grounds for Political Action: Phenomenology, the Arts, and Civil Society”, a conference organized by The Rimbaud and Verlaine Foundation (2019); “Culture and Value after Wittgenstein”, a conference held at The Queen's College, Oxford (2019); “Inequality, Religion, and Society: John Rawls and After”, a conference dedicated to the philosophical legacy of the most significant political philosopher of the 20th century, John Rawls, which took place in early 2019 at Harvard University;

“Two Visions of Europe: What Sources of Hope for the Future?”, an international conference and seminar in the Cracking Borders, Rising Walls Series organized by Kultura Liberalna in Warsaw; the annual Central European Forum in Bratislava, a discussion conference founded by Václav Havel; a conference on Trust and Understanding organized by the Broumov Monastery; and “Margaret Thatcher in historical perspective”, a lecture organized by the Centre for Political Philosophy, Ethics and Religion at the Faculty of Arts, Charles University in Prague.

The Sekyra Foundation sponsored a project at the Institute for Human Sciences (Institut für die Wissenschaften vom Menschen) in Vienna called the “Annual International Editors’ Roundtable”, which includes authors and editors from prestigious intellectual non-academic periodicals from across the political spectrum (The Economist, The Week, openDemocracy, Eurozine, Esprit, FAZ, and Süddeutsche Zeitung) and the 57th International Congress of European Journalists, which took place in Prague for the first time in 2019 and was organized by former RFE/RL journalist Lída Rakušanová. It also arranged an evening discussion at the Václav Havel Library with the CEO of The New York Times Company Mark Thompson, and leading representatives of the Czech media.

The Sekyra Foundation supports the idea to erect a new building for the Czech National Library, recently revived by the Czech Centre of the PEN International and The Jan and Meda Mládek Foundation. One potential location is the former Žižkov freight railway station, part of which will be the site of a new neighborhood built by the Sekyra Group.

The Foundation is contributing to the publication of a three-volume set of memoirs of Dr. Emil Ščuka, who played an important role in the emancipation of the Roma national minority in the Czech Republic (published by the Václav Havel Library, 2019).

In 2021, the Foundation supported an international symposium dedicated to Ludwig Wittgenstein. The symposium is organized in cooperation with the Vienna Circle Society and the Vienna Circle Institute at the University of Vienna.

=== Partners ===
- University of Oxford, UK
- Edmond J. Safra Center for Ethics, Harvard University, Cambridge, USA
- Athens Democracy Forum and The New York Times, USA
- University of Notre Dame, USA
- Europaeum, a network of leading European universities, Oxford, UK
- The Centre for Political Philosophy, Ethics, and Religion, Charles University, Prague

=== Supported organizations ===
- Václav Havel Library, Prague
- Václav Havel Human Rights Prize
- Czech Centre of PEN International, Prague
- Czech Christian Academy, Prague
- Liberal Institute, Prague
- Kultura Liberalna, Warsaw
- Czechoslovak Documentation Centre, Prague
- European Journalists Association, London, UK
- Institute Vienna Circle (Institut Wiener Kreis), Vienna
- International Crisis Group, Washington, USA
- Central European Forum, Bratislava, Slovakia[19]
- Foyer, Sint-Jans-Moelenbeek, Belgium
- The Rimbaud and Verlaine Foundation, London, UK
- Salve, A Revue for Theology and Spiritual Life
- Broumov Monastery
- Klasika Plus, a classical music website

=== Sponsorship of the 30th anniversary of the Velvet Revolution ===
- Festival of Freedom
- Concert for the Future
