= Rohan City =

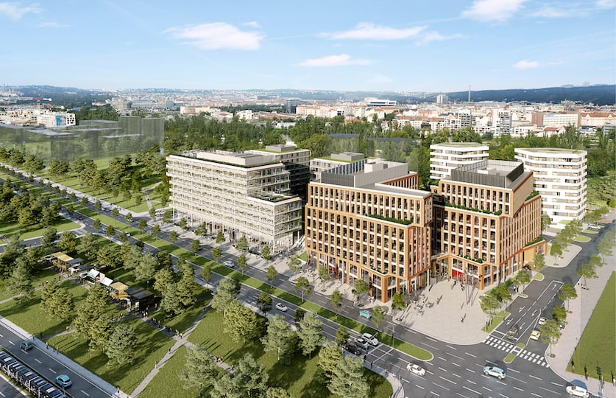
Rohan City – First phase of development

Rohan City is the name of a planned neighborhood on the former Rohan Island located at the borders of the Prague neighborhoods of Karlín, Invalidovna, and Libeň. The project will be an extensive revitalization effort including apartment buildings and administrative complexes, which will also contain spaces for public facilities and services. The planned location also includes space for a school building. The element uniting the project will be a kilometer-long promenade on the right bank of the Vltava planned along the route of the current A2 riverside bicycle path. This promenade will create a fluid transition between urban structure and the green recreational area of an extensive park that will be built along the bank of the Vltava River.

The overall design saw contributions from world-famous Danish urban designer Jan Gehl and architect Eva Jiřičná. The Sekyra Group is the project’s investor, at a total of more than 18 billion CZK (more than 7,3 million EUR). Rohan City will provide housing and offices for approximately 13 thousand people. Construction of all phases is expected to be completed by 2035. The urban planning study for the new neighborhood between the Libeň Bridge and Karlín was prepared by Pavel Hnilička Architekti and approved by the Prague City Council.

== Description ==
Rohan Island was previously an unused and neglected area of approximately 21 hectares. The first phase of the project will see the construction of apartment buildings and two office buildings designed by Eva Jiřičná and Jakub Cigler.

The work is projected to start in 2021, and the completion of the final stage of the project is planned for 2035.

The first phase will focus on the center of the developed area across from Invalidovna, where two buildings will be built with approximately 220 apartments. Nearby, two administrative buildings will be constructed with roughly 30,000 m² of space.

The second phase of the Rohan City project will connect with the existing River Gardens project on its western side. This phase will include city blocks as well as an extensive park connected to the Kaizel Gardens.

The central part of Rohan Island will be built up in the next phase, including a multifunctional zone and public space, which will become the natural center of the whole neighborhood connecting fluidly to the riverside promenade.

In designing the buildings, architect Eva Jiřičná focused on both economically effective operation and flexible use of space. The administrative building will consist of eight stories, and one underground story will be available for use as well. A view of the city and a place for rest will be provided by a shared terrace.

The competition for the second stage was won by Schindler Seko, Atelier bod architekti, Loxia, Qarta Architektura, and A.D.N.S. Production. The preparations for this phase will take place at the same time as the realization of the first stage. One component will be a future bridge between Holešovice and Karlín, which would thus become an important urban element enlivening Prague’s outer core. The Prague government is planning to announce an architectural competition for this important construction. At the same time, the municipality of Prague will carry out the revitalization of the leisure area between the river and the existing bicycle path aimed at creating a recreational zone that aims to be similar in size to Stromovka.
