= Smíchov City =

Development project in Prague

Coordinates: 50°4′1″N 14°24′19″E

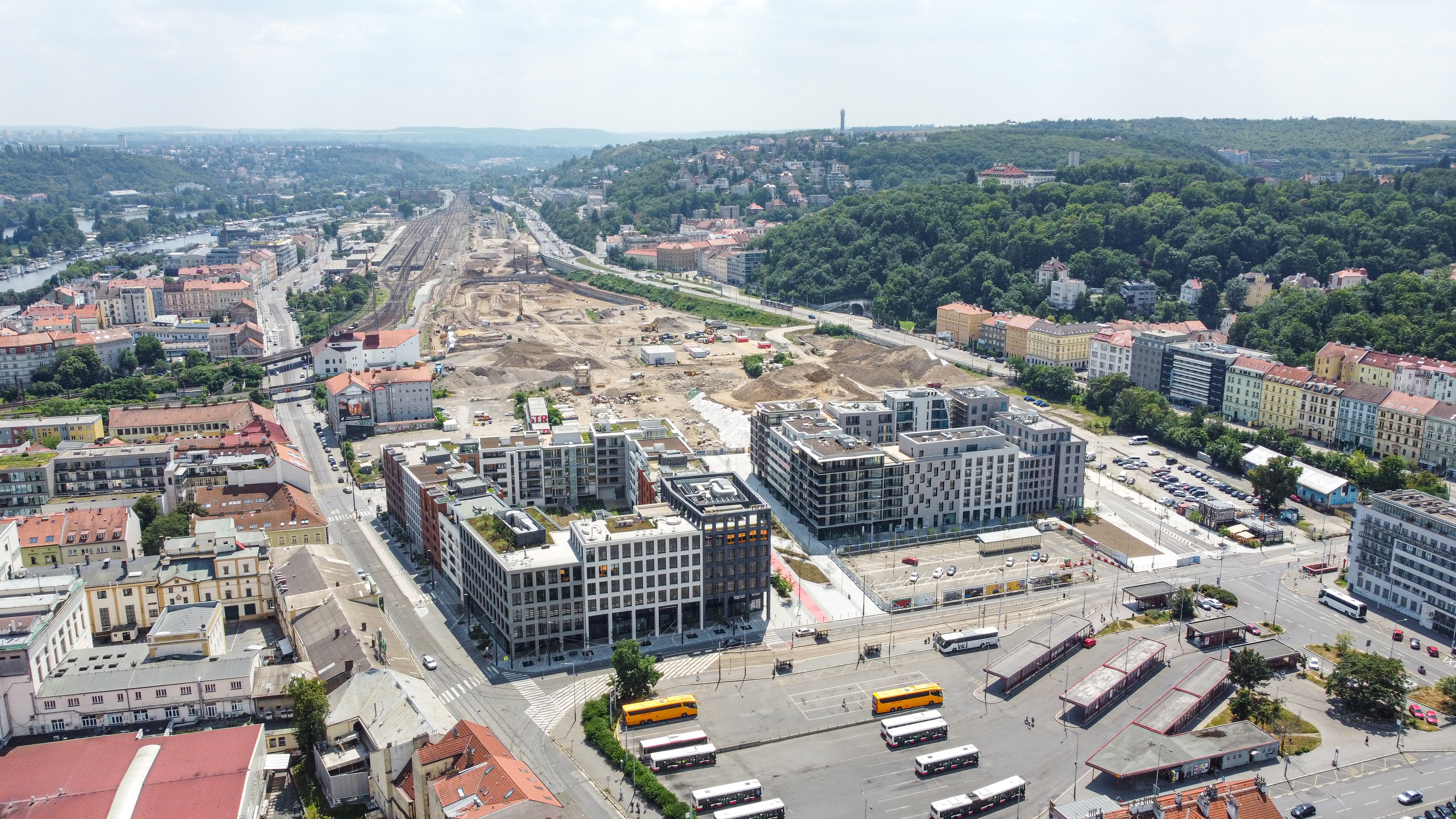
Smíchov City, state of the construction – 2024

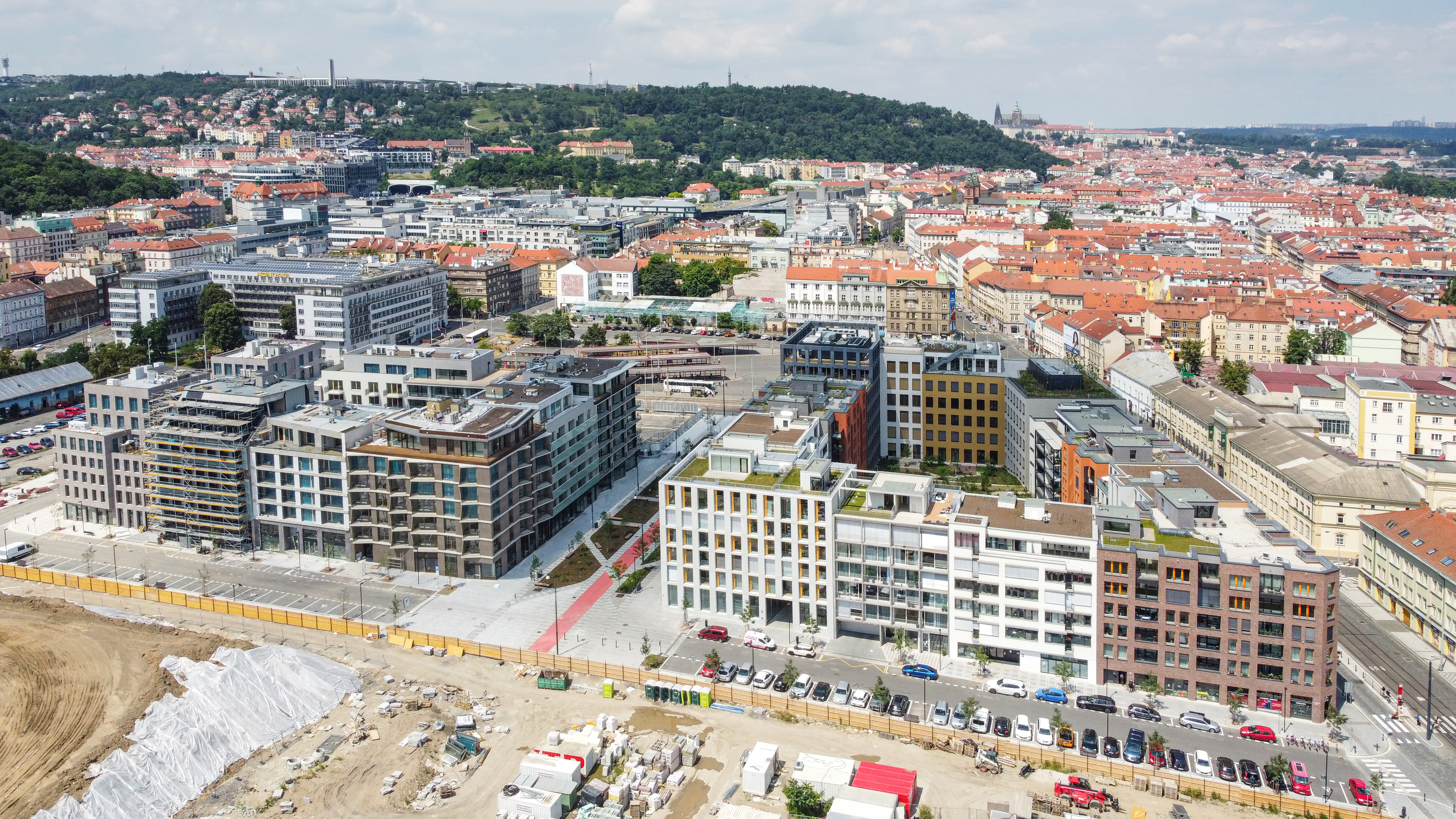
Smíchov City – 2024

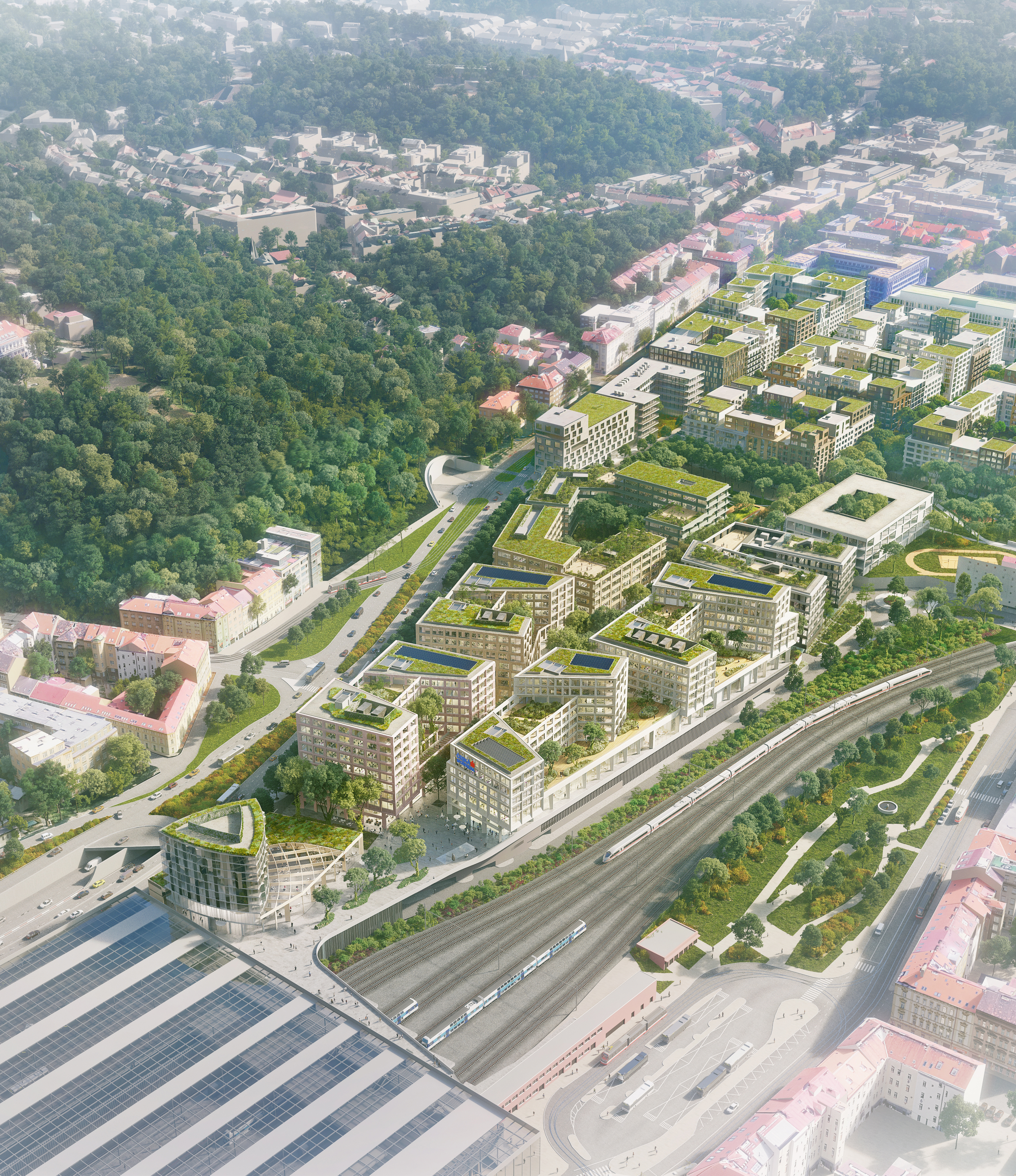
Smíchov City, visualization of the second stage

Smíchov City is a large-scale urban development project in Prague, Czech Republic, located on the site of the former freight railway station in Smíchov, covering approximately 20 hectares. Construction began on 30 September 2020 and is scheduled for completion in 2032.

== Overview ==
The project encompasses nearly 400,000 m² of residential, administrative, commercial, and public space. Planned features include a 28-meter-wide pedestrian boulevard running north to south through the development, 21,000 m² of green space, and various public facilities including a school. The development is designed to accommodate approximately 12,000 residents and workers upon completion.

The Sekyra Group serves as the project's primary investor, with an estimated private investment of 1.38 billion EUR (35 billion CZK). An additional 590 million EUR (15 billion CZK) in public funding is allocated for related infrastructure improvements, including modernization of the railway station and construction of a transport terminal.

== Design ==
The architectural design was determined through an international competition organized with input from the Czech Chamber of Architects and the Prague Institute of Planning and Development. More than 21 architecture studios are involved in designing different sections of the development, including A69 — architekti, Kuba & Pilař architects, Haascookzemmrich STUDIO 2050, and others.

Buildings in the development are designed to meet PENB Category B energy efficiency standards at minimum, with plans for BREEAM certification for environmental sustainability. Energy sources will include geothermal wells and photovoltaic power stations, with rainwater collection systems for green space irrigation.

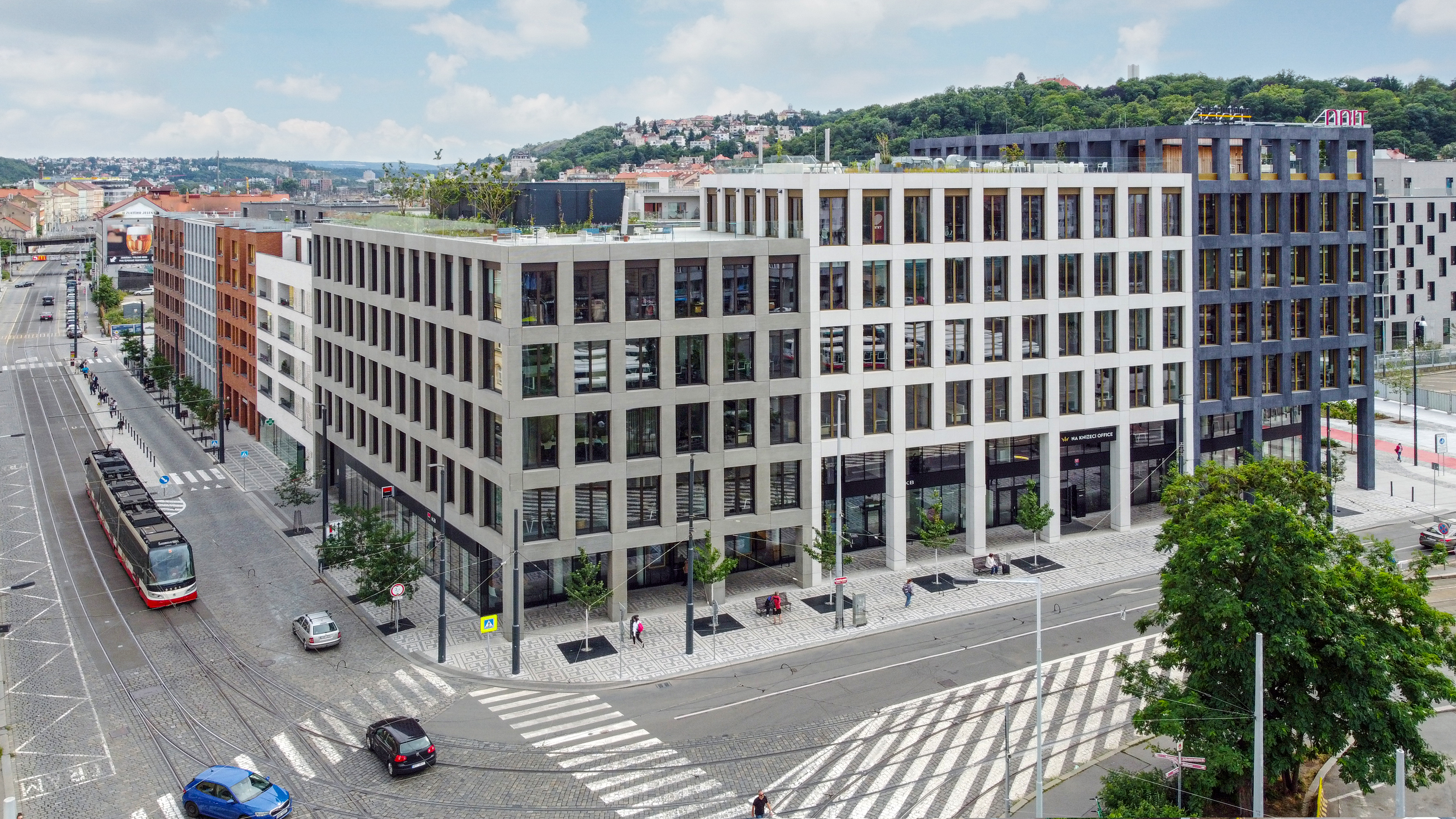
Smíchov City – 2024

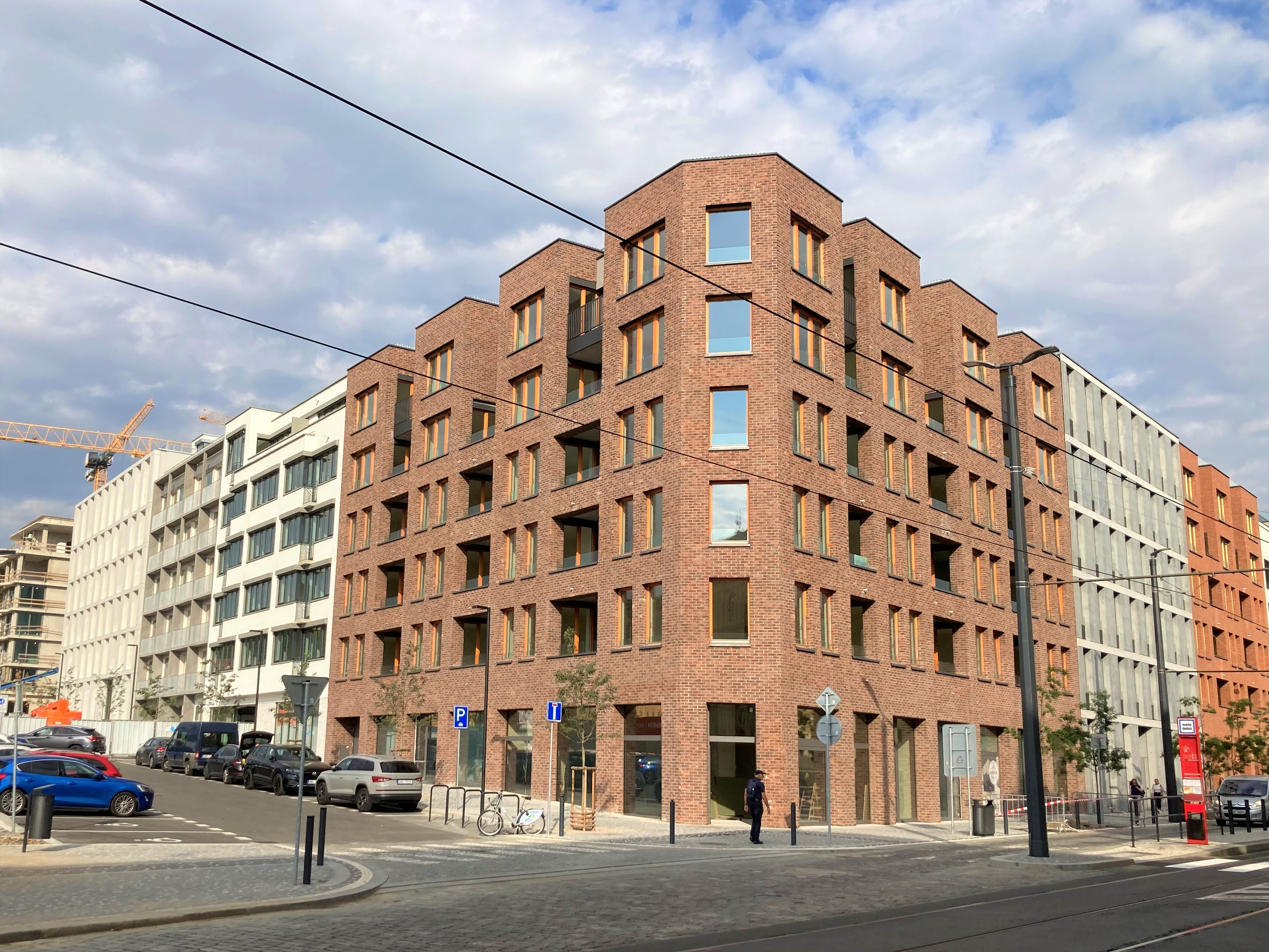
State of the building in 2023

== Development stages ==
=== Stage 1 ===
The first phase consists of residential development between Za Ženskými Domovy, Nádražní, and Stroupežníckého Streets, comprising approximately 400 apartments in 18 residential buildings, plus the Na Knížecí administrative building. This phase covers 27,000 m² with an investment of 3 billion CZK. Construction began in September 2020, with the first 195 apartments completed by 2022.

=== Stage 2 ===
The second phase covers the southern portion of the site and includes the new headquarters for Česká spořitelna, designed to accommodate 3,500 employees. Additional facilities include a hotel, the Smíchov Market, and three administrative buildings, totaling 45,000 m² of built-up area. The design was awarded to a consortium of Baumschlager-Eberle from Austria and Czech studio Pavel Hnilička Architects+Planners.

An elementary school is planned as part of this phase, designed by Canadian and Polish architects Office Ou and Innostudio following an international competition that attracted 66 entries. Construction of this phase began in 2024 with an investment of 30 billion CZK.

=== Stage 3 ===
The third phase consists of three residential blocks (SM7, SM8, and SM10) between Nádražní Street, Madeleine Albright Boulevard, and Vackové Street, creating approximately 800 apartments for over 2,000 residents.

=== Stage 4 ===
The final stage will border Radlická Street and will preserve the Radlická kulturní sportovna building, a community cultural and sports facility.

== Transport infrastructure ==
A new transport terminal is under construction adjacent to the development, scheduled for completion in 2027. The Smíchov Terminal will integrate 11 forms of public transit, including metro, urban transit, and long-distance rail and bus services, with capacity for 250,000 daily users. The facility will include a parking garage for 1,000 vehicles and bicycle parking facilities. The terminal construction began in February 2024 with public funding of 117 million EUR (4.5 billion CZK).

== See also ==
- Luděk Sekyra
- Urban planning in Prague
