= Michal Hvorecký =

Slovak author (born 1976)

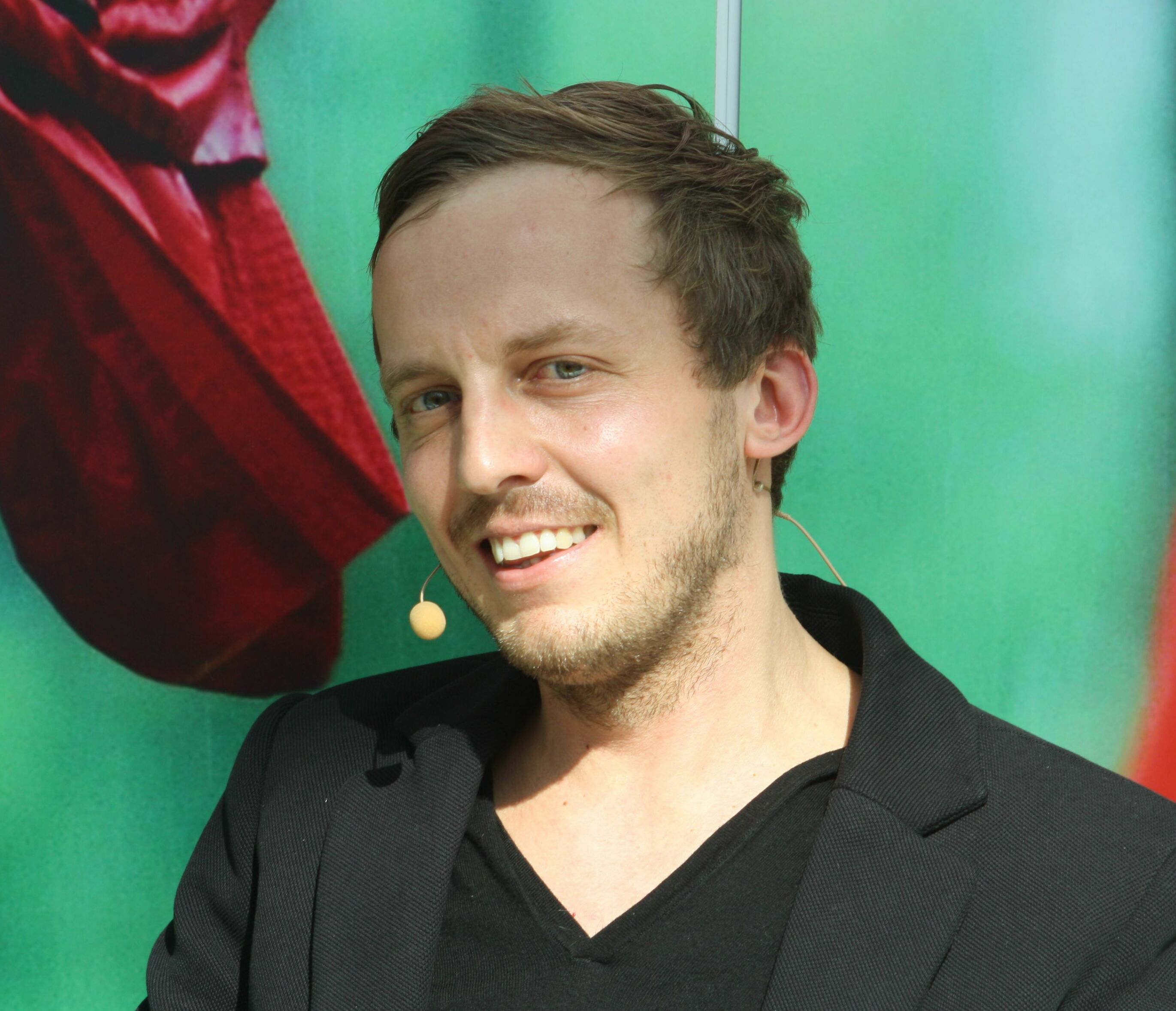
Michal Hvorecký at Leipzig Book Fair 2012

Michal Hvorecky (born 29 December 1976) is a Slovak author.

He is the author of two collections of short stories: Strong sense of Cleanliness (1998) and Hunters & Gatherers (2001). His novel The Final Hit appeared in 2003, Plush in 2005 (published in 2006 in German translation as City: Der unwahrscheinlichste aller Orte) and Eskorta in 2007 (will be published in 2009 in German translation).

His books have been translated into German, Polish, Czech and Italian. Translations of his fiction and journalism have appeared in print in Germany, the United Kingdom, Slovenia, Hungary, Poland and the Czech Republic. The novel Plush was dramatised and performed in the Prague theatre Na zabradli and in Schauspiel Hannover in Germany. In addition, Hvorecky writes regularly for various newspapers and magazines.

He has been awarded several literary prizes and fellowships, including the Literary Colloquium in Berlin, MuseumsQuartier in Vienna, Goethe Institut in Munich, and an International Writing Program in the United States.

The author also contributes to Slovak newspapers such as daily SME. Some of his articles translated into English can be found at the webportal Salon.

In 2000 he co-founded the Wilsonic Festival in Bratislava with Tibor Holoda and served as one of its co-organizers until 2001.

He lives in Bratislava, Slovakia.

== Works ==
- The end of the economic miracle by Michal Hvorecký, English, June 2009
