= Perlentaucher =

German online magazine (2000-)

- Company type: corporation
- Industry: media
- Founded: March 2000
- Headquarters: Berlin, Germany
- Key people: Niclas Seeliger (CEO); Anja Seeliger; Thierry Chervel
- Number of employees: 25
- Website: www.perlentaucher.de

Perlentaucher is a German online magazine. It was founded and is published by Anja Seeliger and Thierry Chervel and has been available since March 15, 2000.

The magazine styles itself as a culture magazine, with its main focus on German culture and feuilleton and a daily overview of book reviews that have been published in a range of main German newspapers. With more than 500.000 visits per month Perlentaucher claims to be the biggest culture magazine in Germany.

In 2003, Perlentaucher was awarded the prestigious Grimme Award for online journalism, the jury calling it a "one-of-a-kind 'journal of journals'".

Another online magazine run by Perlentaucher Medien was the English-language signandsight.com. Signandsight was first published in 2005, bringing a news digest of articles on European cultural topics. It was discontinued in March 2012 due to the presently unfavourable "economic climate".

The Perlentaucher magazine also cooperates with the website Salon run by the Slovak organisation Project Forum.
