= Project Forum =

- Type: non-profit organisation
- Industry: non-profit
- Founded: (2006)
- Headquarters: Bratislava, Slovakia
- Website: www.salon.eu.sk

Project Forum is a non-profit organisation established in 2006 in Bratislava, Slovakia. The organisation's main mission is to support education, promote culture and create space for debate and polemical exchange in Europe.

The organisation's main activity is maintaining the Salon website which offers up-to-date surveys of essays and articles published by the European and world press, with a special focus on Central Europe. So far, the work of over 200 authors from all over the world has been featured or quoted, and Salon also includes their profiles. Authors featured include Timothy Garton Ash, Péter Esterházy, Slavenka Drakulić, Umberto Eco, Václav Havel, Bernard-Henri Lévy, Orhan Pamuk and Victor Erofeyev. From its home country of Slovakia, Michal Hvorecký, Rudolf Chmel and Martin M. Šimečka are among those featured most frequently.

Rather than trying to offer an exhaustive review of everything being published in Europe and elsewhere, Salon aims to survey and introduce of the most influential and provocative texts, those that offer new and interesting insights or angles. Brief annotations, posted in Slovak, English and German provide readers with a concise outline of each text, and the hyperlinks provided take the reader directly to the website of the publication where the article originally appeared. These include Newsweek, the New Yorker, the Economist, Frankfurter Rundschau, Libération and many others.

Salon may be compared to the German-language Perlentaucher – one of the most prestigious on-line surveys of essays and feuilletons published worldwide – established by the French-German journalist Thierry Chervel. However, unlike Perlentaucher, Salon is multilingual.

== See also ==
- Central European Forum
