= St. Salvator Church =

- Kostel Nejsvětějšího Salvátora
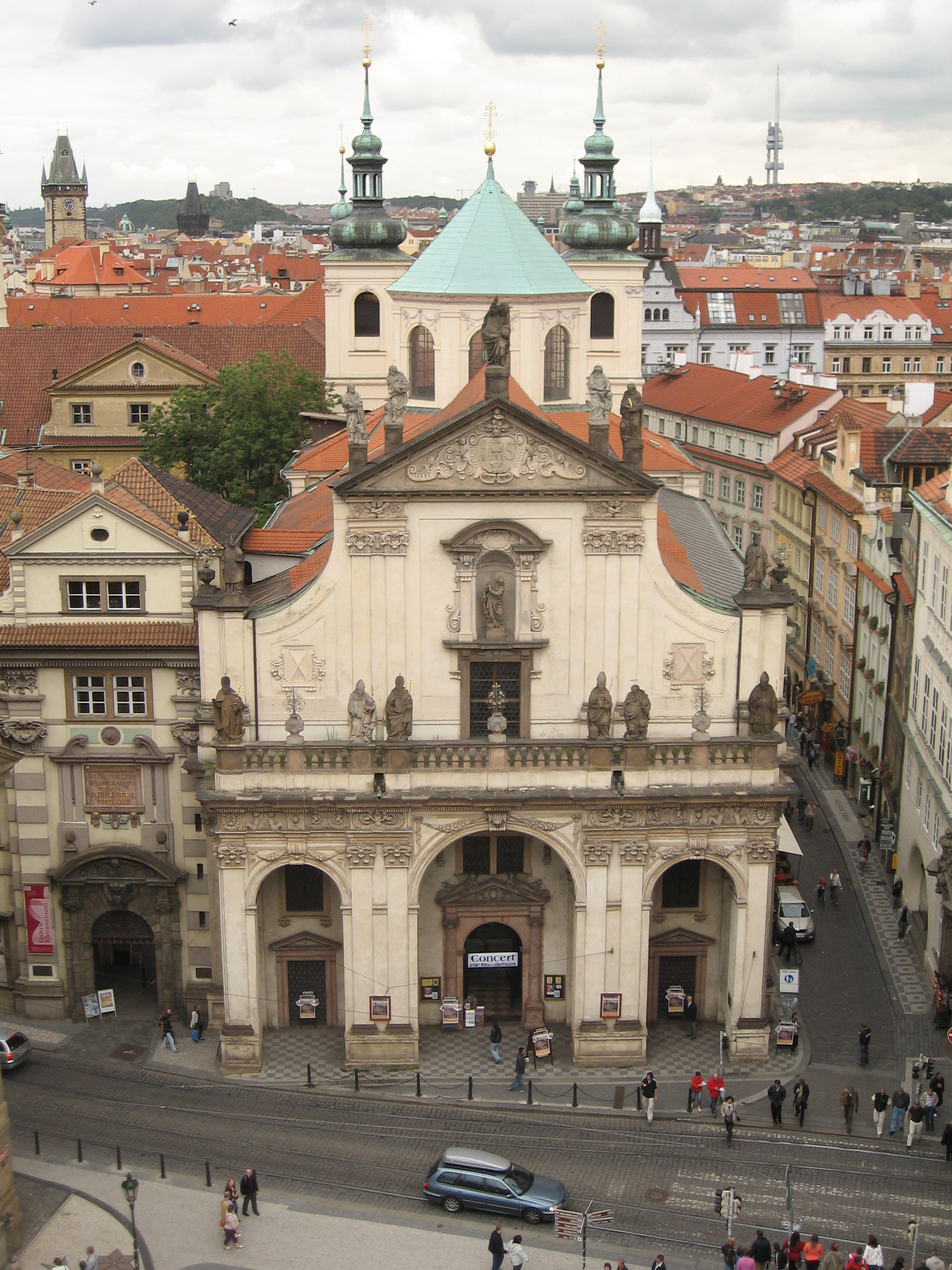
- The church's exterior
- St. Salvator Church
- 50.0861°N 14.4144°E
- Location: Prague
- Country: Czech Republic
- Denomination: Roman Catholic

Architecture
- Architect(s): Carlo Lurago; Francesco Caratti; František Maxmilián Kaňka
- Style: Baroque

Administration
- Diocese: Archdiocese of Prague

St. Salvator Church (Czech: Kostel svatého Salvátora) is a Catholic church in the Klementinum in Old Town, Prague, Czech Republic.

== History ==
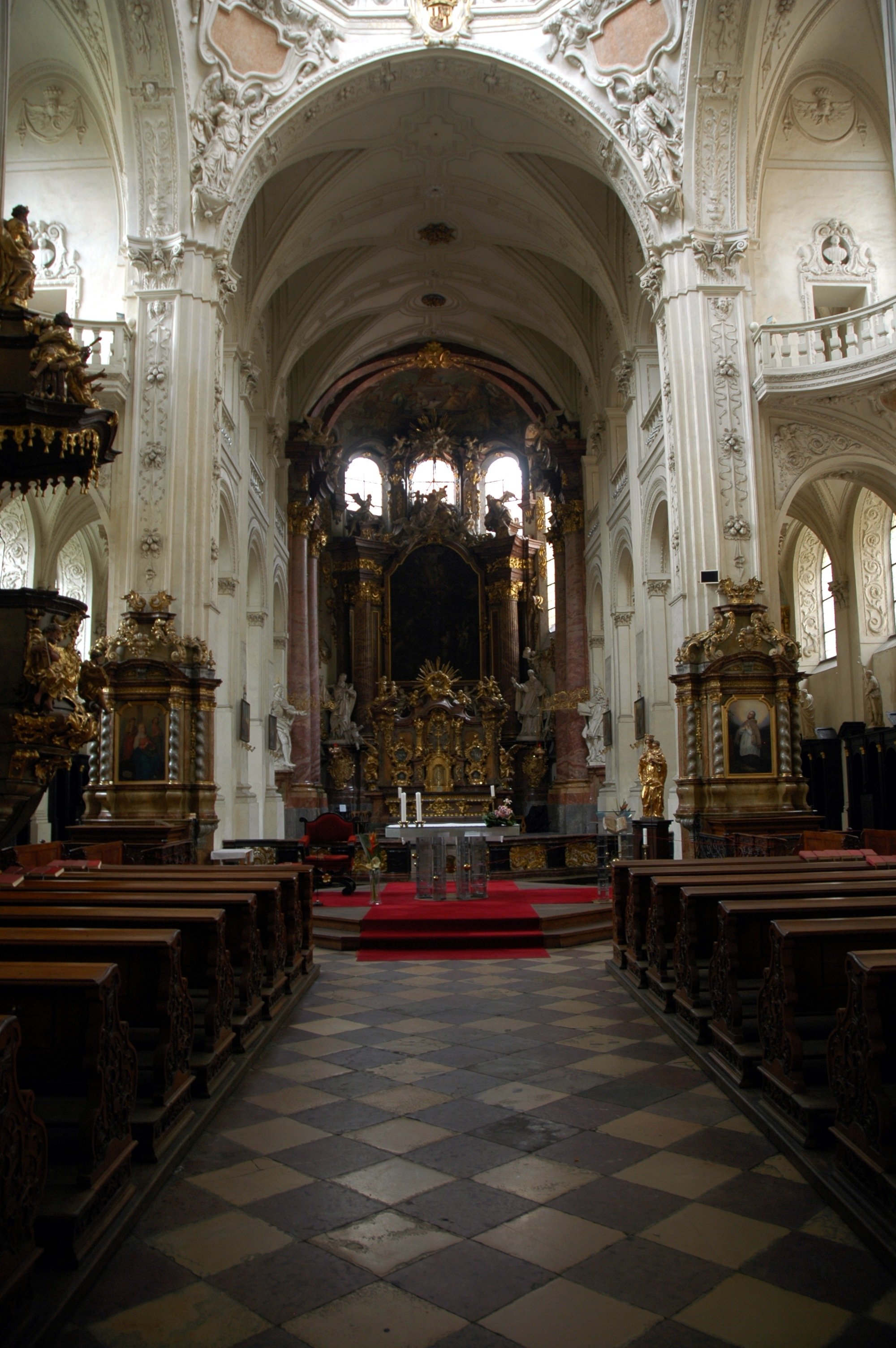
Interior of St. Salvator Church

The church was built on the foundations of the Gothic Church of St. Clement, affiliated with the Dominican Order. For many years, from the turn of the 16th-17th century, it was gradually built by anonymous people, then by Carlo Lurago and Francesco Caratti. As early as 1578 - 1581, the Society of Jesus, led by Rector Giovanni Paolo Campana, laid the foundations of the building, then a chancel and a transept were built.

In 1581, the primate of the neighboring Jewish ghetto, Mordechai Maisel donated 100 thalers to build the church, which testifies to a completely unprecedented tolerant atmosphere and the peaceful coexistence of different religions within Rudolfinian Prague.

At the beginning of the 17th century, a whole nave and a western marble portal with a portico were built. The church received built-in emporiums and stucco decoration. The construction was managed by the Italian architect Carlo Lurago. At the end of the 1740s, a dome was hung above the sanctuary, decorated with stucco from the workshop of Johann Georg Bendl. This is the so-called false dome of the octagonal floor plan on the tholobate. The stucco decoration later had to be removed for its weight and replaced with a new one. From 1654 to 1659, according to Lurago's design, a new representative façade was built with three arched arcades reminiscent of Roman triumphal arches. The church towers were modified and raised in 1714 by architect František Maximilián Kaňka.

In the 18th century, anti-Reformation Jesuit theologian Antonín Koniáš occasionally preached in the church. Between 1805 and 1819, Bernard Bolzano, a university preacher, was here. Jakub Jan Ryba played the organ here in the 1880s. In 1950, Oto Mádr devoted himself to the pastoral care of university youth.

=== College ===
The adjacent dormitory included the missionary Karel Slavíček, the later Bishop Franz von Dietrichstein, Tomáš Pešina of Čechorod, Saint Jan Sarkander, and the revivalist Josef Dobrovský. After the Velvet Revolution, priests Aleš Opatrný (1990–1991), Jan Jandourek (1993–1995) and Milan Norbert Badal OP (1995–1996) worked in the church, among others.

== See also ==
- List of Jesuit sites
