= Libeň Bridge =

Bridge over the Vltava river in Prague

Libeň Bridge Libeňský most
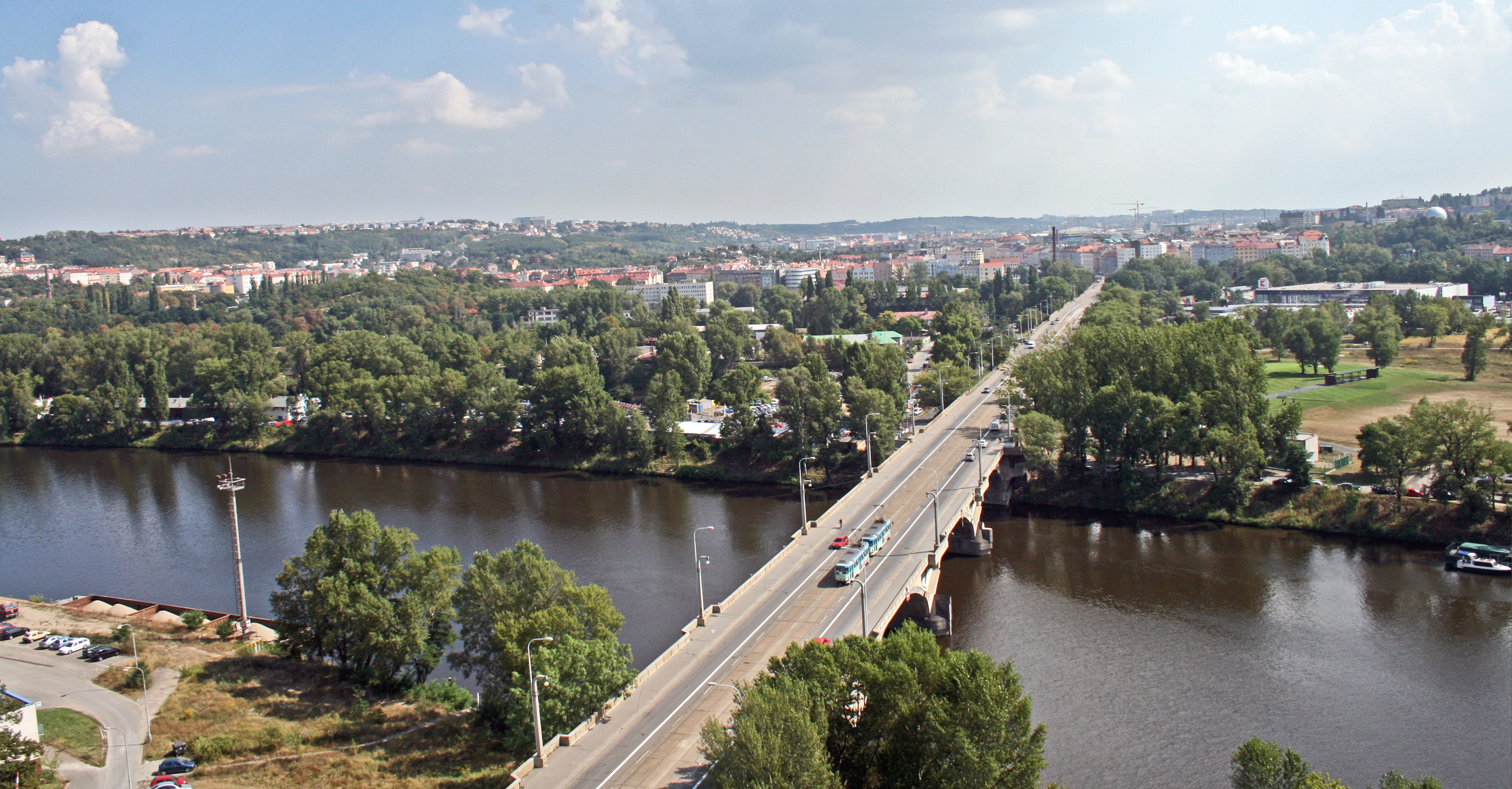
- Libeň Bridge in Prague
- Coordinates: 50°06′12″N 14°27′36″E
- Crosses: Vltava
- Locale: Prague, Czech Republic

Location
- Interactive map of Libeň Bridge

The Libeň Bridge (Czech: Libeňský most) is a bridge in Prague over the river Vltava. It connects the city quarter Holešovice on the left side with the city quarter Libeň on the right side of the river. It is the fifteenth bridge way down the river and there is a tram line on its roadway.

== Architecture ==
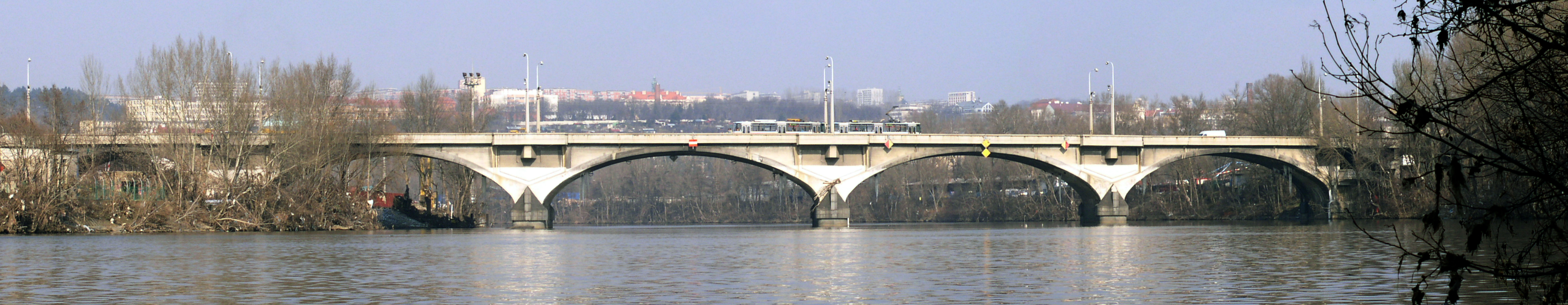
Skyline of the bridge

The Libeň Bridge is 370 metres long but it has 780 metres together with the ramp on the side of Holešovice. With its 780 metres, it is the longest bridge in Prague. Its wide is 21 metres and the tram line is a part of the bridge since its opening.

The concrete bridge was designed by architects Pavel Janák and František Mencl in the Cubist style. It has five arches with the spans between 28 and 43 metres. It has replaced the temporary wooden bridge which stood on its place since the year 1903. The Libeň Bridge was open for the public on April 29, 1928, to the tenth anniversary of the existence of Czechoslovakia.

The bridge was slightly damaged by the flood in the year 2002. In 2016, a study by the ČVUT stated that the bridge needs restoration. On early January 19, 2018, the Prague City Hall closed the bridge for cars and trams. On March 3, 2018, the bridge got reopened for trams. On January 11, 2024, the bridge got closed for trams again.

== Names of the bridge ==
Originally proposed name: Masaryk Bridge (Masarykův most), in honor of Tomáš Garrigue Masaryk, the first President of Czechoslovakia
1928-1939: Libeň Bridge (Libeňský most), according to the nearest city quarter Libeň
1939-1940: Baxa Bridge (Baxův most), in honor of Karel Baxa, the mayor of Prague in the years 1919-1937
1940-1945: Libeň Bridge (Libeňský most), according to the nearest city quarter Libeň
1945-1952: Baxa Bridge
1952-1962: Stalingrad Bridge (Stalingradský most), according to the city of Stalingrad (Volgograd today)
since 1962: Libeň Bridge

== Photogallery ==
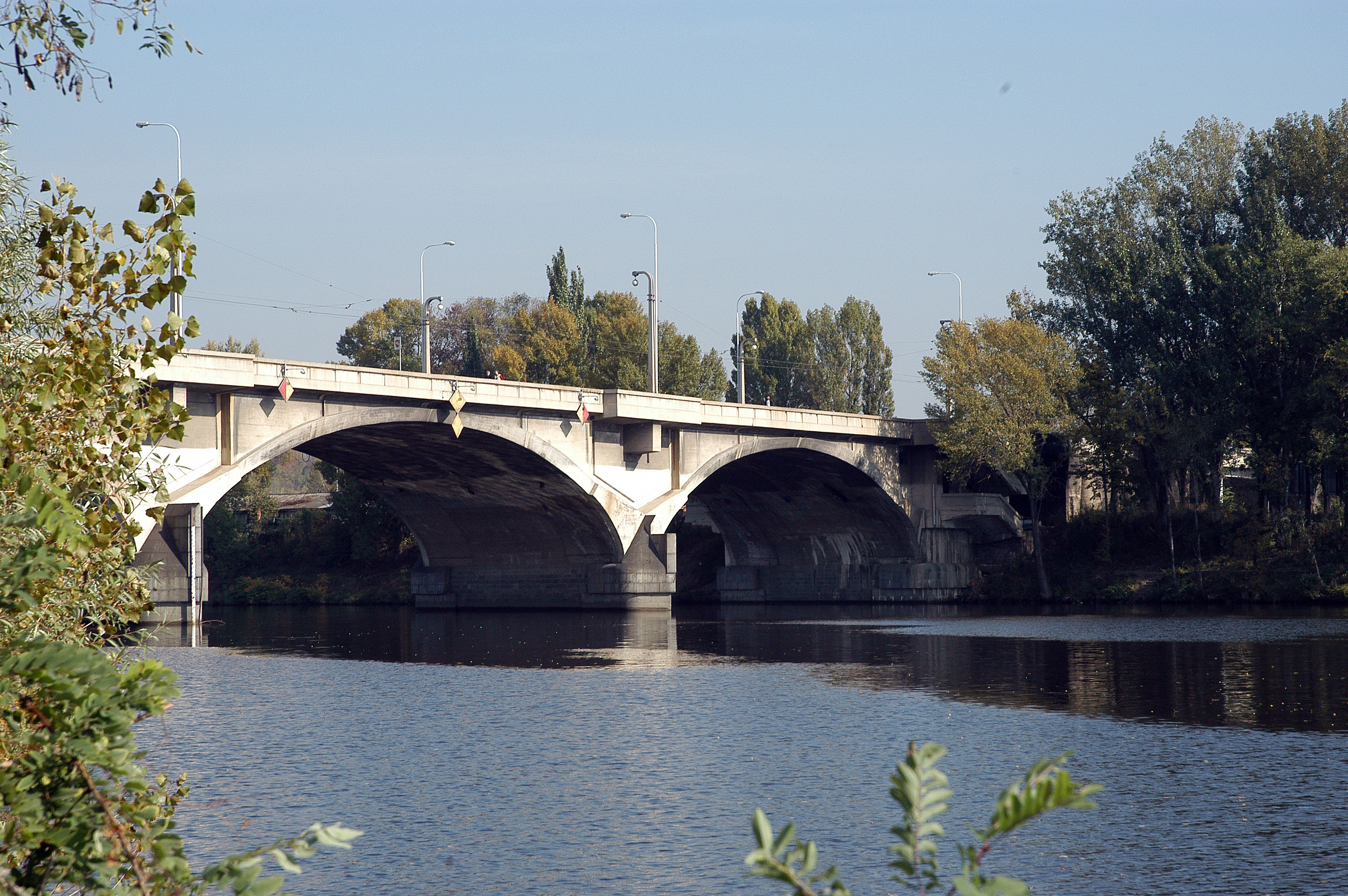
Libeň Bridge from the river

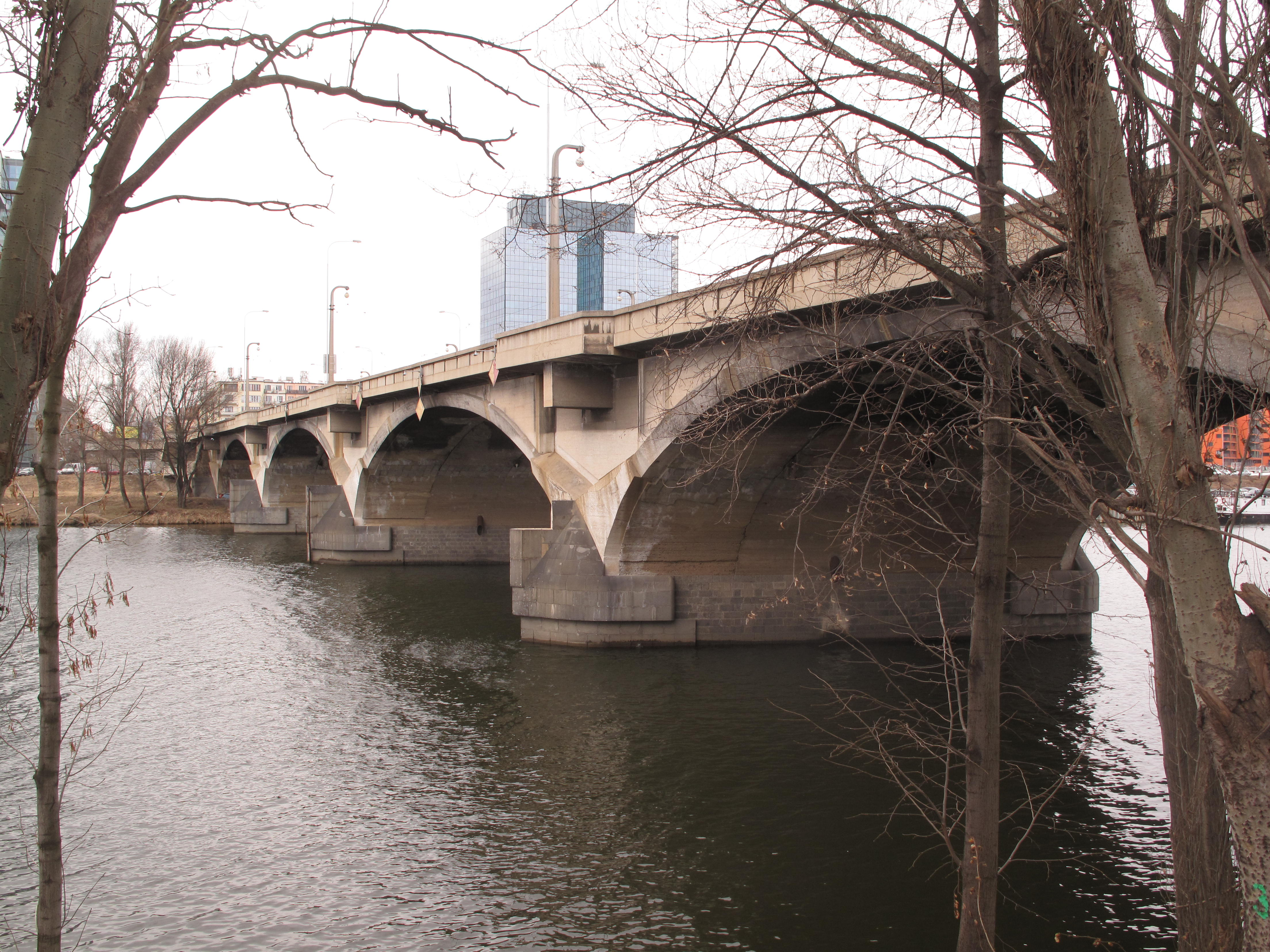
Libeň Bridge over the river

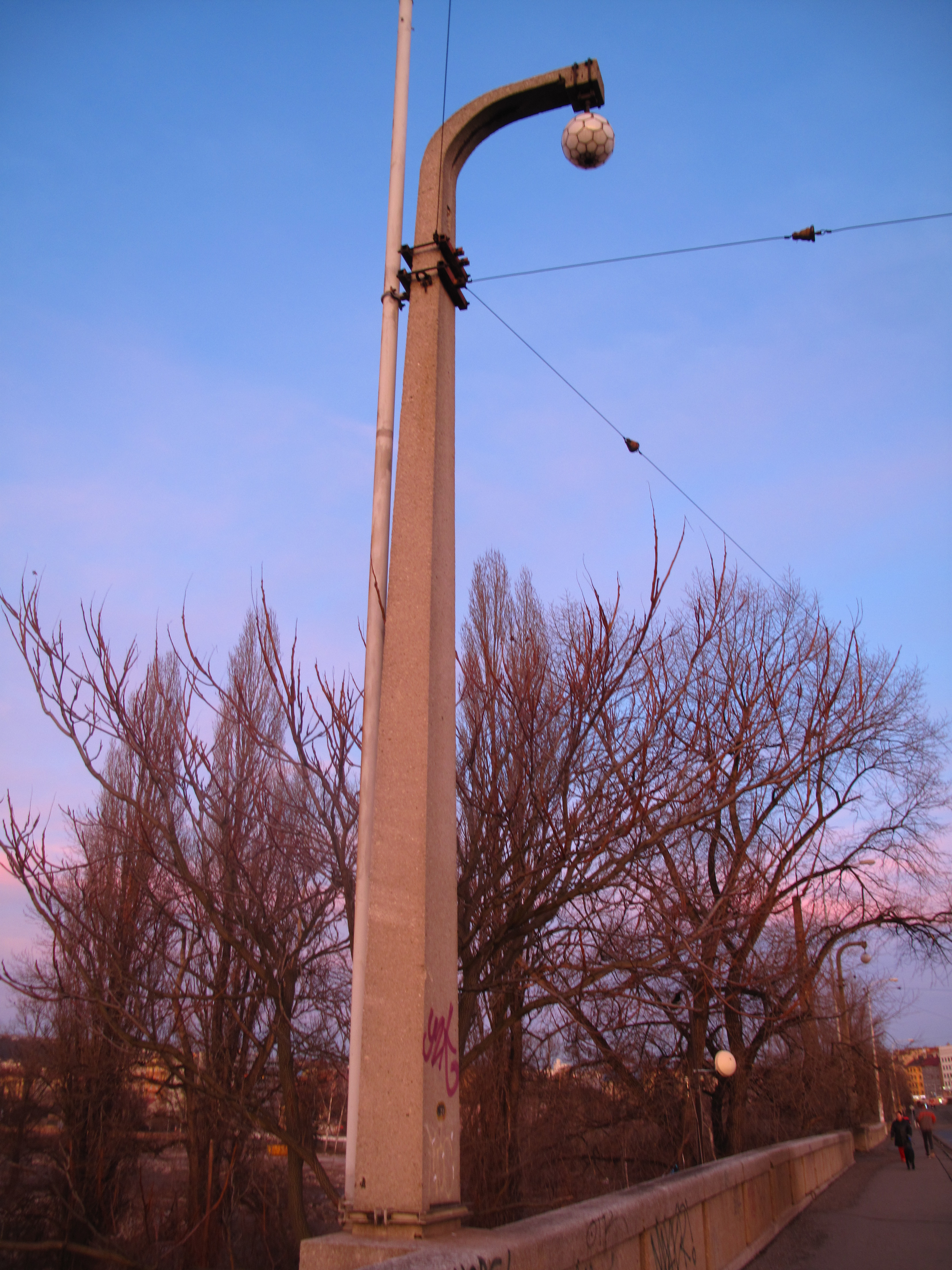
Lamp

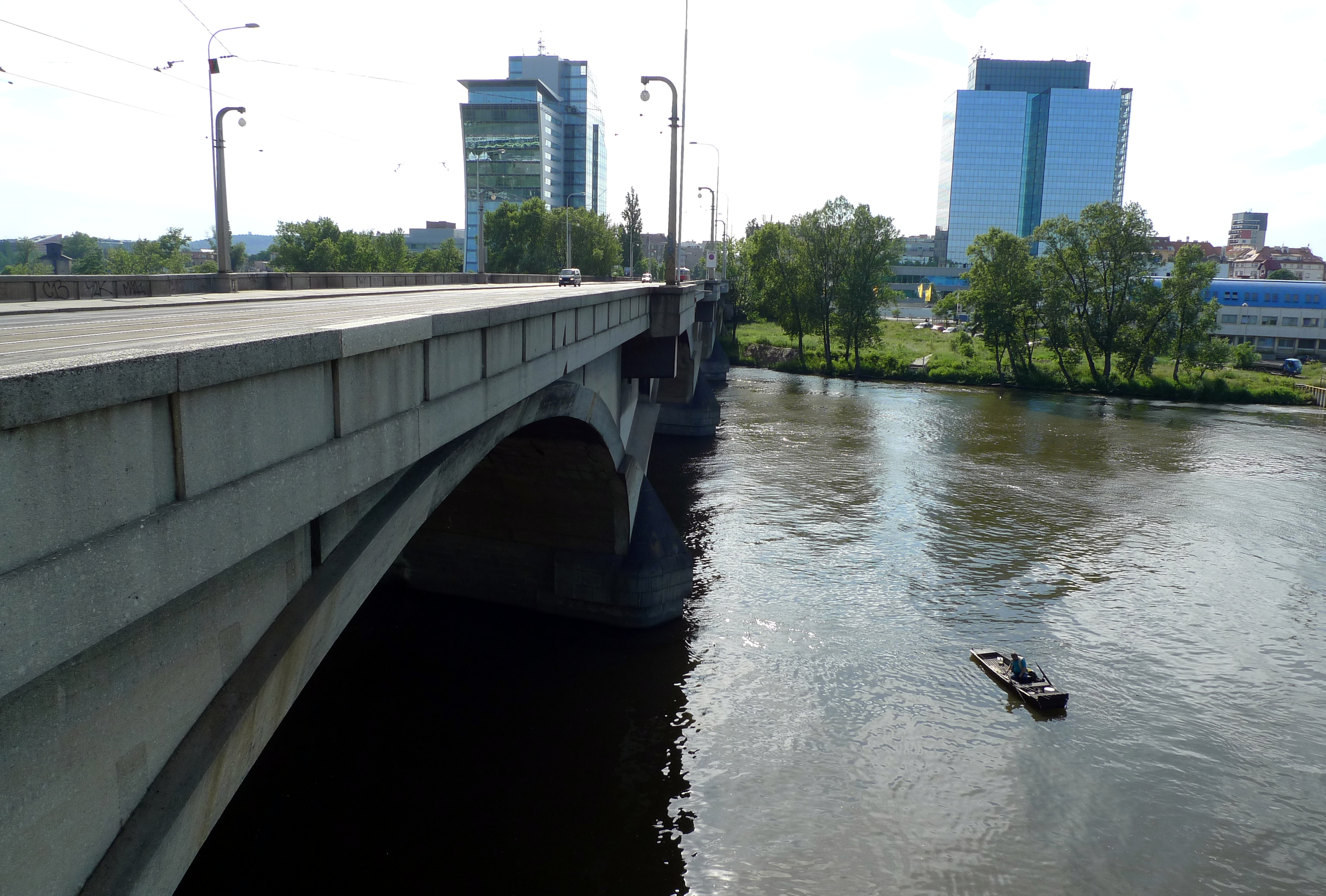
Way to Holešovice

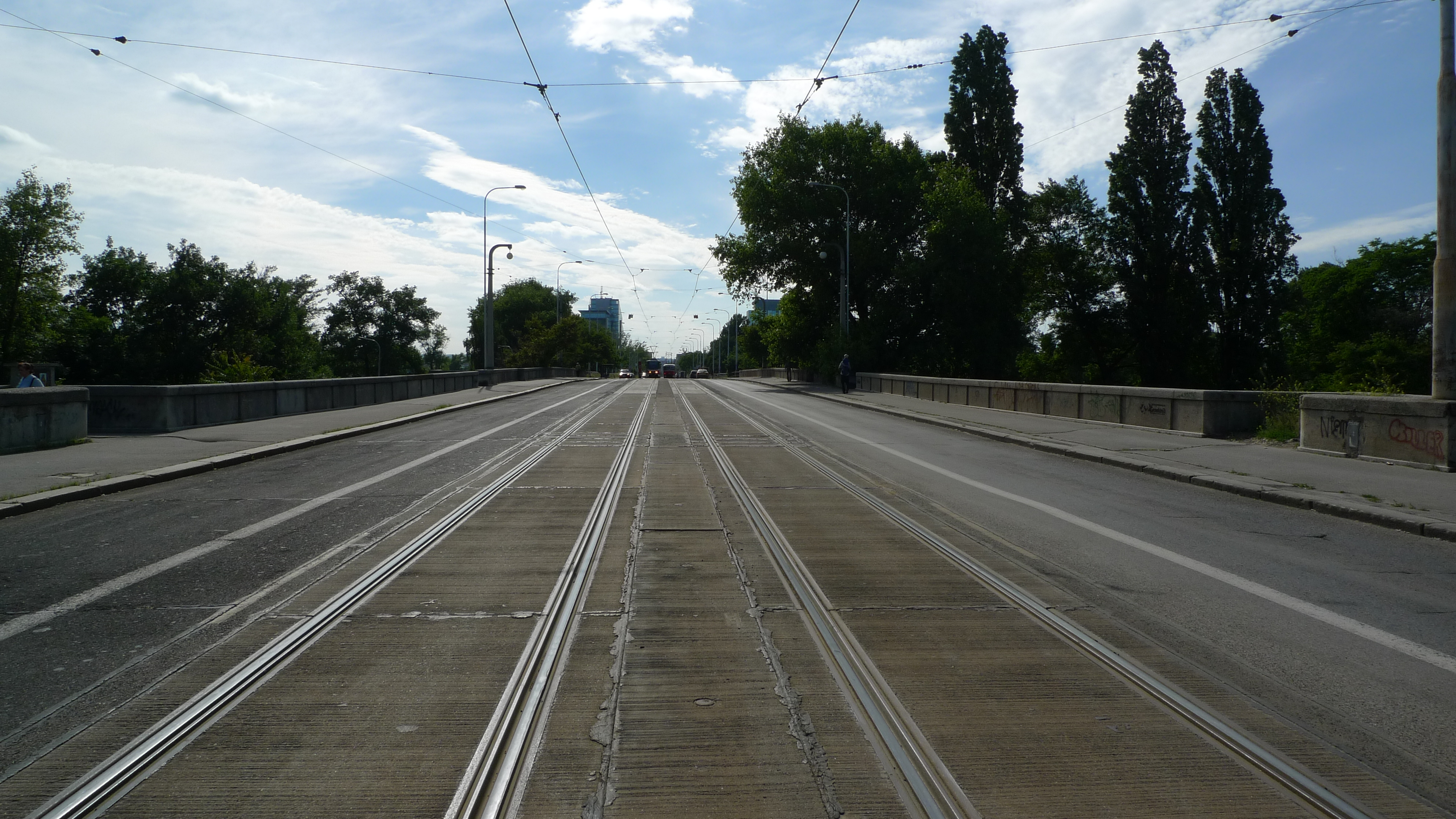
Tramway-line

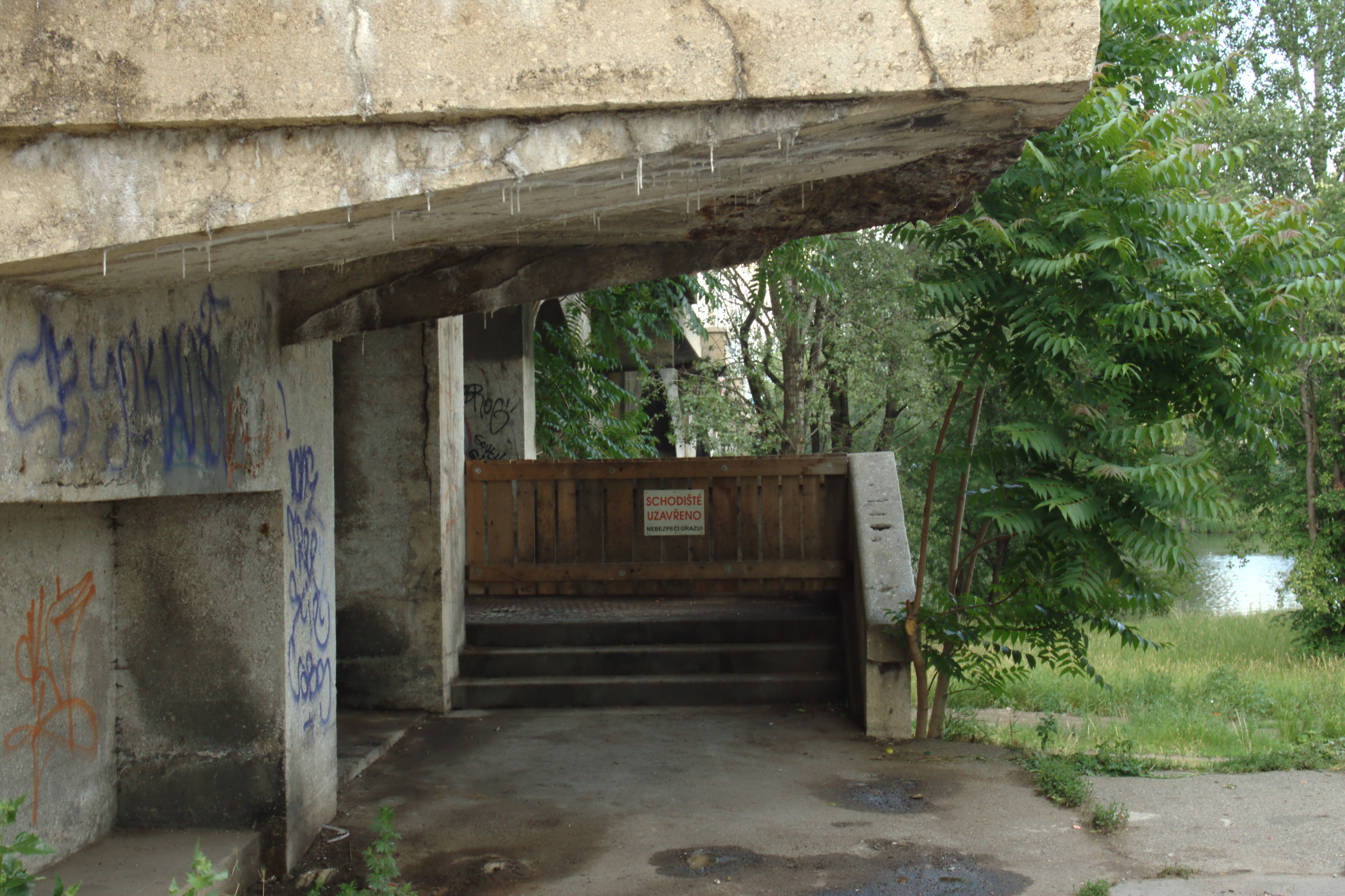
Staircase in a desolated condition
