= Tomáš Halík =

Czech Catholic priest, philosopher, and sociologist (born 1948)

The Reverend Monsignor Tomáš Halík
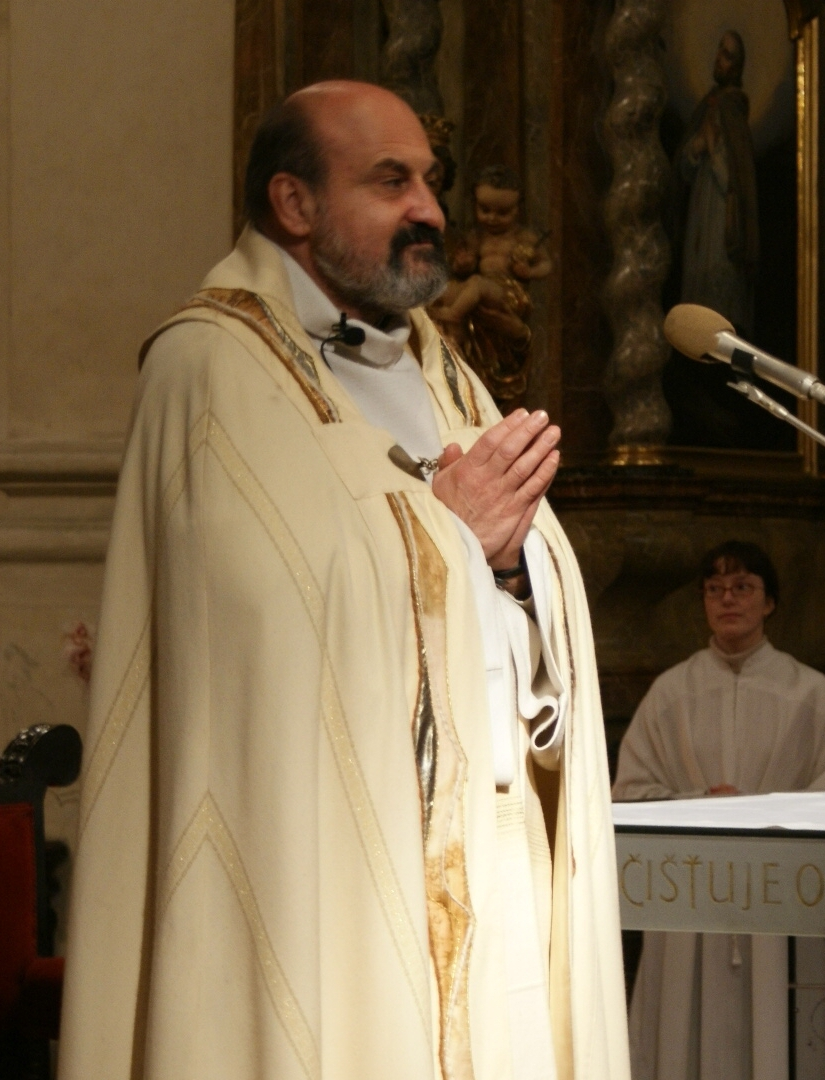
- Halík celebrating a Mass in St. Salvator Church, 2009
- Born: 1 June 1948 (age 78); Prague, Czechoslovakia
- Education: Charles University in Prague
- Occupations: Priest, philosopher, theologian
- Awards: Cardinal König Prize; 2003; Romano Guardini Prize; 2010; Templeton Prize; 2015; Knight's Cross of the Order of Merit of the Republic of Poland

Ecclesiastical career
- Religion: Christianity
- Church: Roman Catholic Church
- Ordained: 21 August 1978 (priest)
- Writings: Patience With God; Night of the Confessor
- Congregations served: St. Salvator Church, Prague
- Website: www.halik.cz/en/

Tomáš Halík (Note: Czech: [ˈtoma:ʒ ˈɦali:k]; in isolation, Tomáš is pronounced [ˈtoma:ʃ]) (born 1 June 1948) is a Czech Catholic priest, philosopher, and theologian. He is a professor of sociology at the Charles University in Prague, pastor of the Academic Parish by St. Salvator Church in Prague, and president of the Czech Christian Academy.

Since 1989, Halík has lectured at universities and international scientific conferences in Europe, the United States, Asia, Australia, Canada, and Southern Africa. He was also a visiting professor at Oxford University, Cambridge University, and Harvard University.

He is an author of several books on religion and spirituality and a recipient of numerous awards and prizes including the Templeton Prize, Romano Guardini Prize, and an honorary degree from Oxford University. In 2008, Pope Benedict XVI granted him the title of Monsignor Honorary Prelate of His Holiness.

As an active member of religious and cultural dissent during Communist era, Halík was appointed by Pope John Paul II as an advisor to the Pontifical Council for Dialogue with Non-Believers in 1992. In the Saint Salvator Church in Prague, he often holds joint prayers and meditations with members of other religions such as Jews, Buddhists, and Muslims. Due to his views on the other religions, his support for registered partnerships, and later gay marriage, his criticism of the anti-abortion movement, and his stance on immigration, he has received both praise and criticism.

== Biography ==
=== Communist era ===
Halík converted to Catholicism at 18 years old, due to the influence of writers like G. K. Chesterton and Graham Greene. He studied sociology and philosophy at Charles University in Prague, then Czechoslovakia, where he was a student of Jan Patočka. He moved briefly abroad to study English at the University of Wales, in Bangor, where he was surprised by the Soviet-led invasion of his country, meant to crush the Prague Spring, in August 1968. He returned to Prague, where he graduated in 1972. He delivered a speech at his doctoral graduation ceremony that was deemed subversive by the Communist regime, which banned him from teaching or holding any academic position. He then worked as a psychotherapist from 1972 to 1975. He held the chair of Psychology of Work for the Institute of the Ministry of Labour, from 1975 to 1984. Meanwhile, Halík clandestinely studied Theology in Prague, and on 21 August 1978, was secretly ordained as a Roman Catholic priest at Erfurt, East Germany. He studied and received a post degree in Psychology from the Institute of Medicine in Prague in 1984. He worked as a psychotherapist for drug addicts and alcoholics at the clinic for cure of addictions of the Charles University, in Prague, from 1984 to 1990. In the 1980s he was active in the "underground church" and was a close associate of Cardinal František Tomášek, before the fall of communism in Eastern Europe in 1989.

=== Democratic regime ===
After the "Velvet Revolution", which meant the triumph of democracy in his country, he was one of the external advisers of Czech president Václav Havel. Pope John Paul II appointed him as an adviser to the Pontifical Council for Dialogue with Non-Believers in 1992. He licenciated in Theology at the Pontifical Lateran University, in Rome, in 1992. The same year he took a higher doctorate in Sociology from Charles University and ThDr.hab. in theology at the Pontifical Faculty of Theology in Wrocław, Poland. Halík joined the Sociology Faculty at his alma mater in 1993 and became a professor in 1997. He is also the head of the Religious Studies Department. As a visiting fellow, he held lectureships at both Oxford University and Cambridge University, in England. Hálik is the rector of the Church of the Holy Saviour, in Prague, since 1990, and co-founder and longtime President of the Czech Christian Academy. Pope Benedict XVI nominated him monsignor, as an honorary prelate of the pope, in 2008.

He often publicly discusses ethical issues, such as racism, political and religious intolerance, the process of secularisation, as well as the process of European expansion and integration.

Tomáš Halík is a member of several scientific societies, including the European Society for Catholic Theology, the International Society for the Psychology of Religion, and Washington-based Czechoslovak Society for Science and the Arts.

In 2010, his book Patience with God (Vzdáleným nablízku: vášeň a trpělivost v setkání víry s nevírou) was named book of the month by the U.S. Catholic Book Club and was awarded Europe's best theological book prize.

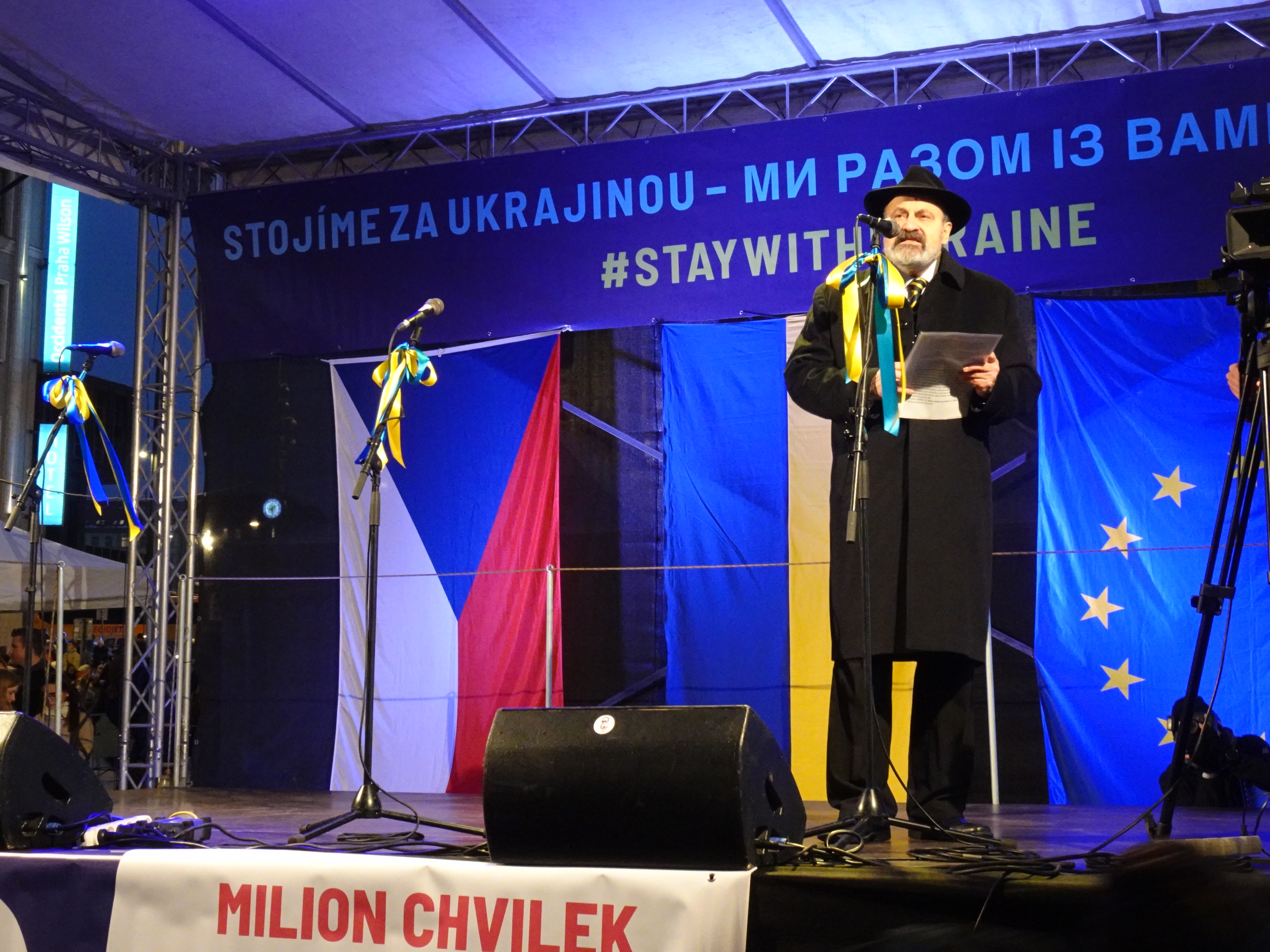
Halík speaking at a pro-Ukraine event in 2022

Halík has publicly speculated a run for the Czech presidency. In 2015, Zdeněk Škromach announced he would run, to which Halík had said the year earlier that, if there were no candidates worthy, naming Škromach as one such candidate, he would have a moral obligation to run. However, in early 2016, he stated that he believed the office of president no longer appealed to him, as "it is the time for demagogues" such as the current Czech President Miloš Zeman and Donald Trump. He also did not believe he had high chances of succeeding in the 2018 race, as he would have only won "the voices of the sane and educated", believing that he would need to go against his moral compass and campaign on a populist and controversial platform.

== Views ==
Halík holds some views that are at odds with the official stances of the Catholic Church. He supports women's ordination and has criticized his church's stance on homosexuality, stating that LGBT Catholics should not be compelled to live in celibacy. He has been supportive of the LGBT Catholic group New Ways Ministry and has agreed to host gay rights demonstrations in his parish church.

Halik also has criticized anti-abortion legislation, specially in Eastern Europe, claiming that the near-total ban on abortion in Poland would "encourage ‘abortion tourism’ of Polish women to the Czech Republic and Slovakia, contributing very little to the protection of the unborn and failing to actually stop the evil of abortion." In an interview given at 6 March 2024, he openly opposes the criminalization of abortion: "We need to learn to function in a pluralistic society; come to terms with the fact that in the legal system of a secular state there is no place for the criminalization of abortion; come to terms with the legalisation of same-sex unions." In his book The Afternoon of Christianity (2024) he openly endorses the rehabilitation of modernism and criticizes strongly Pope Pius X for his condemnation.

== Honors, awards and prizes (selection) ==
- 1997: The prize of the Masaryk Academy of Arts for creative activity (Prague)
- 2002: The Andrew Elias Human Tolerance Award for outstanding services in disseminating the values of tolerance and spiritual and intellectual freedom (USA)
- 2003: The Cardinal König Merit Award for defence of human rights and spiritual freedom, Austria (Laudator: Václav Havel, President of the Czech Republic)
- 2006: The Literary Award of the Czech Literary Fund for the book Night of the Confessor
- 2007: The Fenix Prize of Polish Booksellers for the best book by a foreign author, for the Both Called and Not Called book (Poland)
- 2007: The Prize of the Czech Society for Science and Art for his literary, scholarly and pedagogical activity
- 2010: The Romano Guardini Prize for outstanding merits in interpreting contemporary society, Germany (Laudator: Karel Schwarzenberg, Foreign Minister of the Czech Republic)
- 2010: The Golden St. Adalbert medal for extraordinarily efficient explanation of religion to fellow citizens, Prague (Laudator: Cardinal Dominik Duka, archbishop of Prague)
- 2010: Medal for outstanding services to inter-religious and inter-cultural dialogue (Islamic society Mosaika-Platform, Prague)
- 2011: Honorary title "Man of Reconciliation 2010" for outstanding services to dialogue between Christians and Jews (The Polish Council of Christians and Jews, Warsaw)
- 2012: The Knight's Cross of the Order of Merit of the Republic of Poland by decision of the Polish President
- 2014: Templeton Prize
- 2016: Doctor of Divinity, honoris causa (University of Oxford)

== Publications ==
Books in English

- Patience with God: The Story of Zacchaeus Continuing in Us. Doubleday, New York–London-Toronto-Sydney-Auckland, 2009.
- Night of the Confessor: Christian Faith in an Age of Uncertainty. Doubleday/Image, New York–London-Toronto-Sydney-Auckland, 2012.
- I Want You to Be: On the God of Love. University of Notre Dame Press, Notre Dame, Indiana, 2016.
- From the Underground Church to Freedom. University of Notre Dame Press, Notre Dame, Indiana, 2019.
- Is God absent? Faith, Atheism, and Our Search for Meaning. (A.Grün & T.Halík). Paulist Press 2019.
- Touch the Wounds: On Suffering, Trust, and Transformation. University of Notre Dame Press, Notre Dame, Indiana, 2023.
- The Afternoon of Christianity. University of Notre Dame Press, Notre Dame, Indiana, 2024.

Books in Czech

- O přítomnou církev a společnost (For Present Church and Society). Prague: Křesťanská akademie, 1992. (Essays from 1989 to 1991.)
- Sedm úvah o službě nemocným a trpícím (Seven Meditations about Serving the Diseased and Suffering). Brno: Cesta, 1993.
- Víra a kultura (Faith And Culture). Prague: Zvon, 1995.
- Ptal jsem se cest (I Asked The Roads). Prague: Portál, 1997. (Interviews with Jan Jandourek.)
- Co je bez chvění, není pevné (There is No Firmness Without Trembling). Prague: Lidové noviny, 2002.
- Oslovit Zachea (Addressing Zacheus). Prague: Lidové noviny, 2003.
- Vzýván i nevzýván (Both Called And Not Called). Prague: Lidové noviny, 2004.
- Noc zpovědníka (Night of the confessor: Paradoxes of little faith in a post-optimistic era). Prague: Lidové noviny, 2005. (Published in English under the title "Night of the Confessor")
- Prolínání světů (Overlaps of worlds). Prague: Lidové noviny, 2006.
- Vzdáleným nablízku. (To the distant ones nearby: Fervour and patience in the encounter of faith and non-belief) Prague: Lidové noviny, 2007. (Published in English under the title "Patience with God")
- Dotkni se ran (Touch the wounds: A spirituality of concern). Prague: Lidové noviny, 2008.
- Stromu zbývá naděje (Hope remains for the tree: The crisis as opportunity). Prague: Lidové noviny, 2009.
- Divadlo pro anděly (A theatre for angels: Life as a religious experiment). Prague: Lidové noviny, 2010.
- Smířená různost (Reconciled difference). Prague: Portál, 2011. (Interviews with Tomasz Dostatni)
- Úvahy na prahu tisíciletí - Ranní zamyšlení na vlnách BBC (Reflections on the eve of the millennium -Morning reflections broadcast by BBC Czech service). Prague: Lidové noviny, 2011.
- Chci, abys byl (I want you to be: Post-religion Christianity). Prague: Lidové noviny, 2012.
- Žít s tajemstvím (Living with mystery). Prague: Lidové noviny, 2013.
- Žít v dialogu (Living in dialogue). Prague: Lidové noviny, 2014.
- Obnovíš tvář země (Texts 1988–1998). Prague: Lidové noviny, 2014.
- Svět bez Boha (A.Grün & T.Halík). Prague: Lidové noviny, 2017.
- To že byl život?. Prague: Lidové noviny, 2018.

Books in French

- Patience avec Dieu: l'histoire de Zachée, continue à nous. CERF Paris 2014 (Patience with God)

Books in Italian

- Mistica, anima della filosofia? Fondazione nazionale "Vito Fazio-Allmayer", Palermo 1999
- Vicino ai lontani: la pazienza della fede nel dialogo con l'ateismo. Libreria editrice Vaticana, Citta del Vaticano 2012 (Patience with God)
- La notte del confessore. Milano, Figlie di San Paolo 2013 (Night of the confessor)

Books in German

- "Du wirst das Angesicht der erde erneuern": Kirche und Gesellschaft an der Schwelle zur Freiheit. St.-Benno-Verl., Leipzig 1993 (You shall renew the face of the earth)
- Geduld mit Gott (Die Geschichte von Zachäeus heute). Freiburg: Herder, 2010 (Patience with God)
- Nachtgedanken eines Beichtvaters. Herder Verlag, Freiburg-Wien 2012 (Night of the confessor)
- Berühre die Wunden. Herder Verlag, Freiburg-Wien 2013 (Touch the wounds)
- All meine Wege sind DIR vertraut: Von der Untergrundkirche ins Labyrinth der Freiheit, Freiburg 2014

Books in Spanish

- Un proyecto de renovación espiritual. Narcea, Madrid 1996
- Paciencia con Dios. Herder, Barcelona 2014 (Patience with God)
- Paradojas de la fe en tiempos posoptimistas. Herder, Barcelona 2016 (Night of the Confessor)
- ¿Deshacerse de Dios? Cuando la fe y la increencia se abrazan. (& A.Grün) 2018
- Quiero que seas: Sobre el Dios del amor. Herder, Barcelona 2018

Books in Portuguese

- Paciência com Deus, 2013 Paulinas Editora, 3.ª edição
- A Noite do Confessor, 2014 Paulinas Editora
- O meu Deus é um Deus ferido, 2015 Paulinas Editora
- Quero que Sejas Tu, 2016 Paulinas Editora
- O abandono de Deus. Quando a crença e a descrença se abraçam (& A.Grün), 2017 Paulinas Editora
- Diante de ti, os meus caminhos, 2018, Paulinas Editora

Books in Dutch

- Geduld met God: Twijfel als brug tussen geloven en niet-geloven. Uitgeverij Boekencentrum, Zoetermeer 2014
- De nacht van de biechtvader. Christelijk geloof in een tijd van onzekerheid. Uitgeverij Boekencentrum, Zoetermeer 2016
- Ik wil dat jij bent: over God van liefde. Uitgeverij Boekencentrum, Zoetermeer 2017
- Geloven op de tast. Als geloof en ongeloof elkaar ontmoeten (& A.Grün). Uitgeverij Boekencentrum, Zoetermeer 2017
- Raak de wonden aan van. Over niet zien en toch geloven. Uitgeverij Boekencentrum, Zoetermeer 2018
- Niet zonder hoop. Religieuze crisis als kans. KokBoekcentrum 2019
- In het geheim geloven. Autobiografie. KokBoekcentrum 2020
