= Kuba & Pilař architects =

Czech architectural firm

Kuba & Pilař

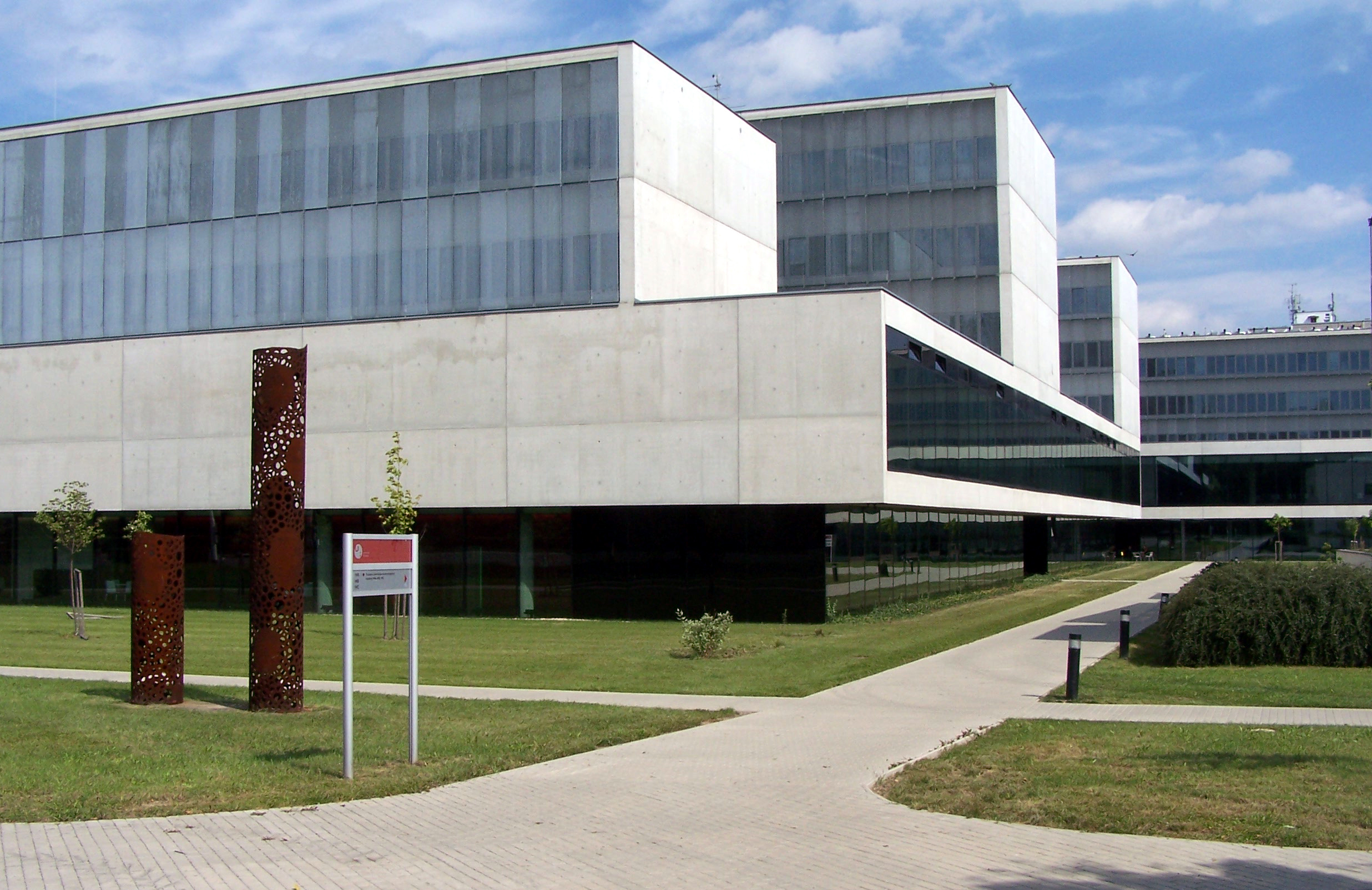
- Faculty of Chemical Technology at University of Pardubice; designed by the firm
- Industry: Architectural firm
- Founded: 1998; 27 years ago
- Founders: Ladislav Kuba; Tomáš Pilař
- Headquarters: Brno, Czech Republic
- Website: arch.cz/kuba.pilar

Kuba & Pilař Architects is a Czech architecture firm based in Brno and established in 1998 by Ladislav Kuba and Tomáš Pilař.

== Professional activities ==
Kuba & Pilař Architects was established in 1998. Kuba worked from 2001 to 2002 as guest lecturer at the Faculty of Architecture at VUT. Pilař also worked there in the years 1994 and 1998-2000. From 2011 to 2012 he was a guest lecturer at the Faculty of Architecture at the Technical University of Liberec. They have given lectures for students and professionals in the Czech Republic, Austria, and Germany.

== Exhibitions ==
- Mega will be Giga – Vienna 2004
- Wonderland Tour – Prague, Berlin, Paris, Amsterdam and some other European cities 2004–2007
- Brick 10 – Vienna 2010
- New Face of Prague – Prague 2010, and some other European cities
- V4 architecture – Prague 2011
- KILL YOUR IDOL (Zabij svého Fuchse) - Psychoanalysis of Contemporary Architecture of the City of Brno - 4AM Brno 2011
- Czech and Slovak pavillon at the 13th International Architecture Exhibition of la Biennale di Venezia 2012
- Kunstverein Leipzig 2013

== Works ==
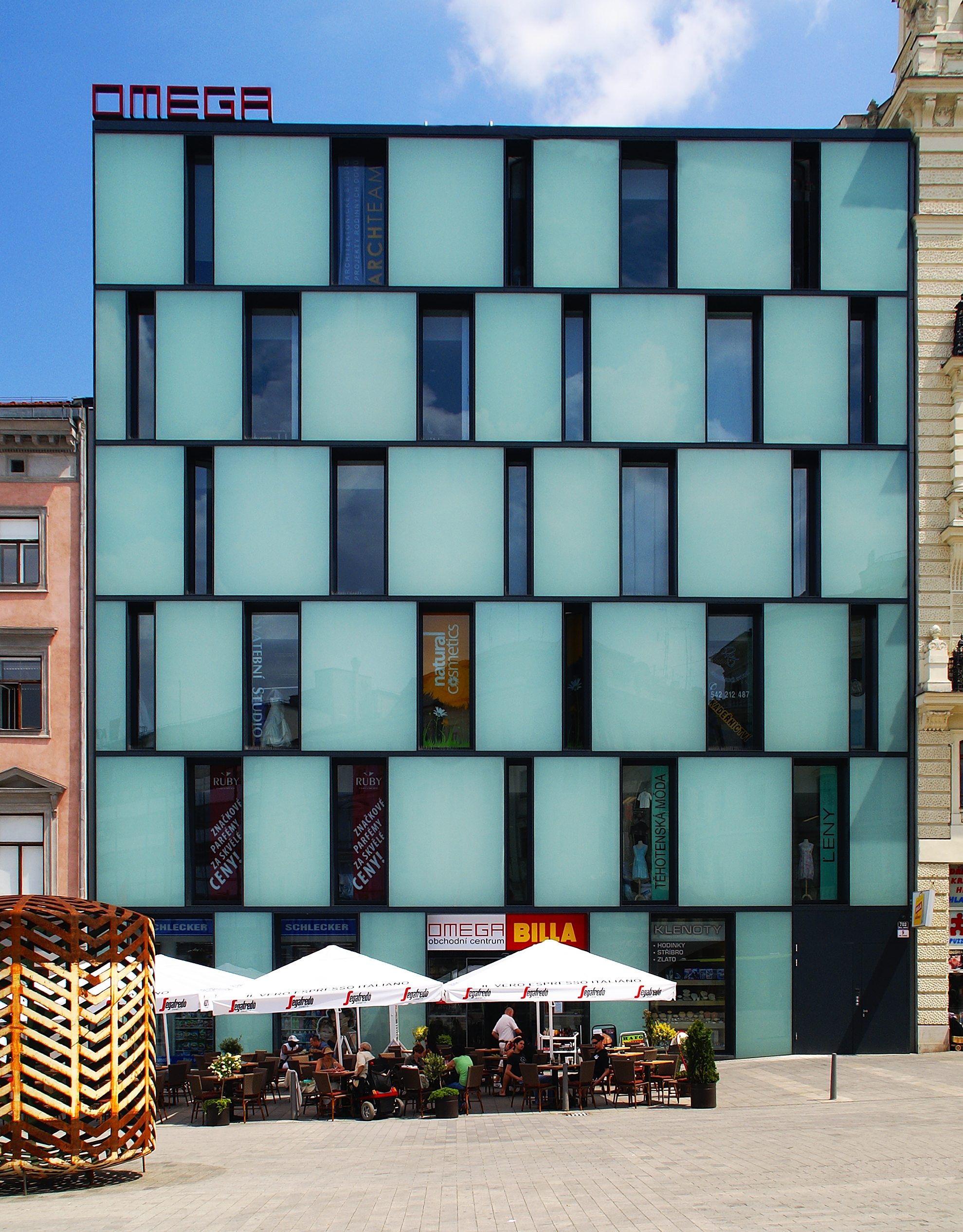
Omega building

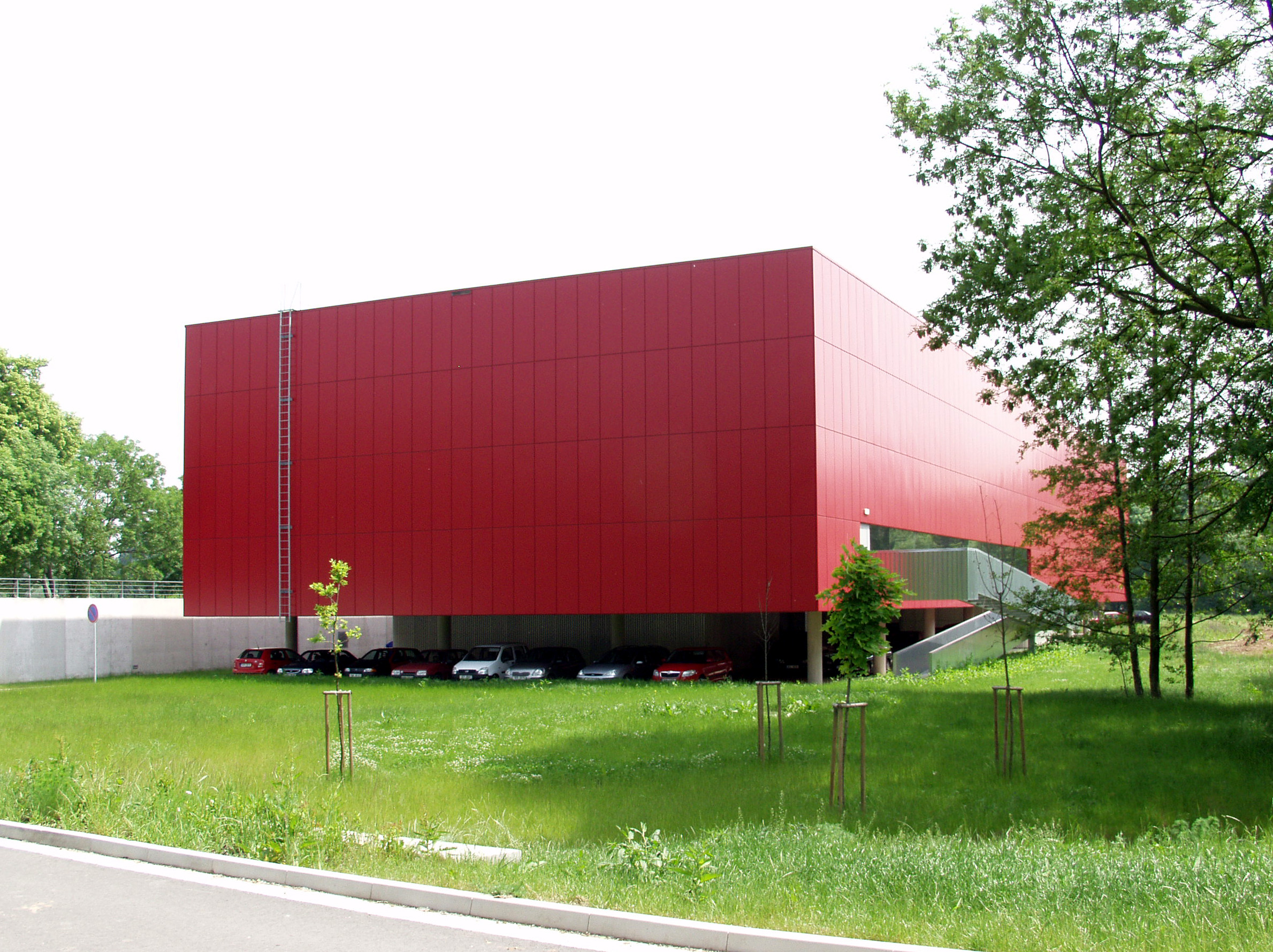
Gymnasium at University of Pardubice

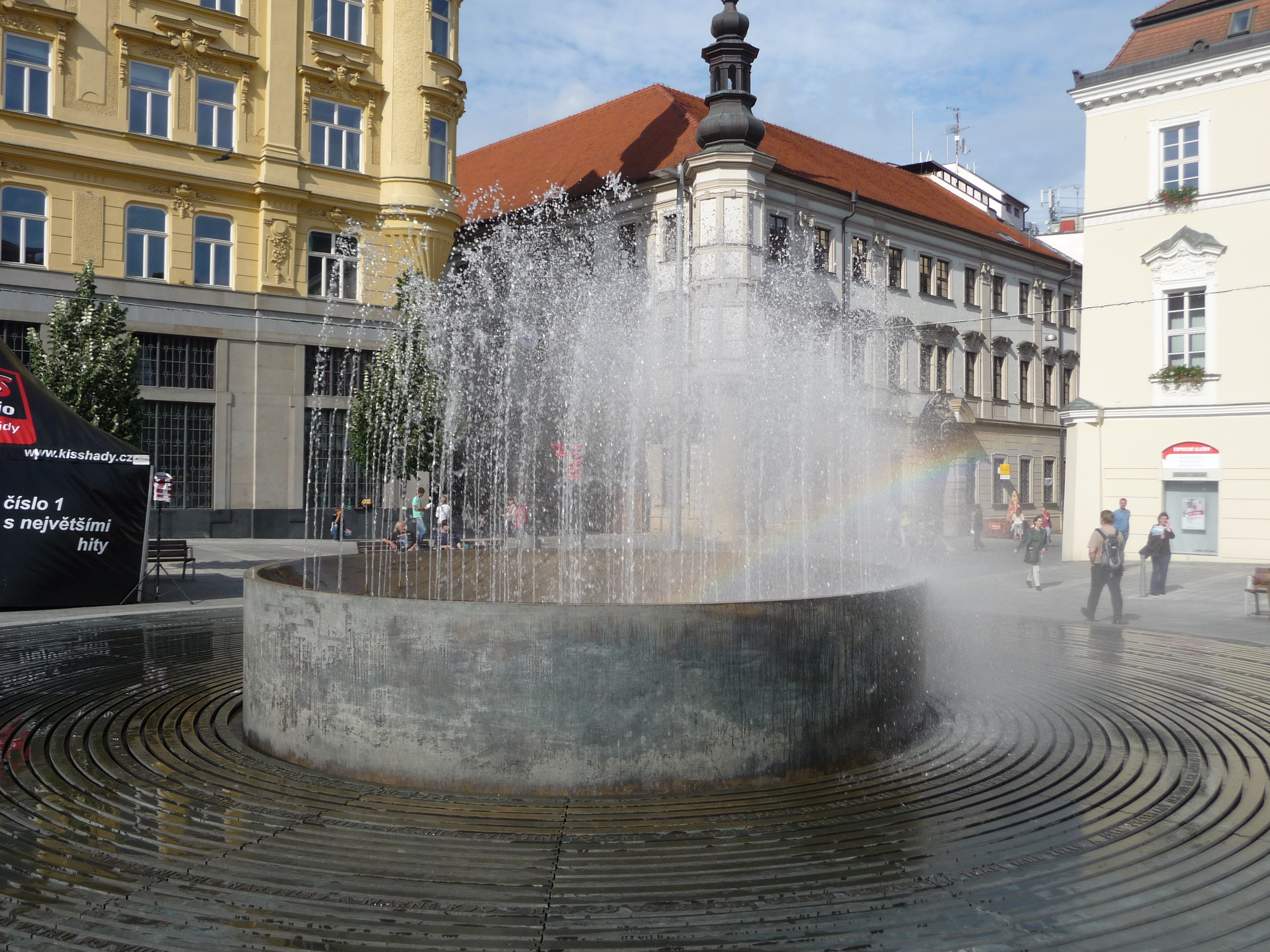
Fountain, Freedom Square, Brno
- Chapel Panny Marie - Královny, Jestřebí, 1998
- Apartment villas in Neumannova street, Brno, 2001
- Faculty of Arts, Library, Masaryk University, Brno, 2001
- Department store Omega, Brno, 2006
- Fountain, Svobody square, Brno, 2006
- Chapel sv. Antonína, Černá, 2006
- Residential estate Na Krutci, Prague, 2008
- Scientific Library, Ostrava, project 2008
- Citypark department center, Jihlava, 2008
- Faculty of Chemistry and Technology, University Pardubice, 2008
- Gymnasium, University Pardubice, 2008
- Apartment house, Ostrava, 2010
- Office building, Ostrava, 2011
- Gallery of West Bohemia, Plzeň, project 2012
- Faculty of Humanities, Charles Univerzity in Prague, project 2013
