= Grzegorz Ekiert =

Polish sociologist (born 1956)

- Born: 1956 (age 69–70)
- Education: Jagiellonian University (MA); Harvard University (PhD)
- Scientific career
- Workplaces: Jagiellonian University (1980–1984); Harvard University (1991–)
- Thesis: The State Against Society: The Aftermath of Political Crises in Hungary, 1956–1963, Czechoslovakia, 1968–1976, and Poland, 1981–1989 (1991)
- Doctoral advisor: Theda Skocpol
- Other academic advisors: Daniel Bell; Piotr Sztompka; John A. Hall; Iván Szelényi

Grzegorz Ekiert (born 1956) is a Polish sociologist and Laurence A. Tisch Professor of Government at Harvard University. He directed the Minda de Gunzburg Center for European Studies from 2012 to 2024.

== Career ==
Ekiert graduated with an MA in sociology from the Jagiellonian University in Kraków in 1980. He received an MA from Harvard University's Department of Sociology in 1987 and completed his PhD in sociology at the same institution in 1991 under the supervision of Theda Skocpol with a thesis titled The State Against Society: The Aftermath of Political Crises in Hungary, 1956–1963, Czechoslovakia, 1968–1976, and Poland, 1981–1989.

Ekiert was a lecturer in sociology at the Jagiellonian University from 1980 to 1984. He joined the faculty of Harvard's Department of Government in 1991. He was the director of Minda de Gunzburg Center for European Studies (2012–2024), the chair of undergraduate concentration in Social Studies (2000–2006) and a senior scholar at the Harvard Academy for International and Area Studies.

He was Robert Schuman Fellow at the European University Institute (2020 and 2022), Resident Fellow in Metaforum Institute, University of Leuven, Belgium (2019), member of the Advisory Board of the Wissenschaftszentrum Berlin für Sozialforschung (2016–2024), External Examiner in Politics, Public Administration and Global Studies at the University of Hong Kong (2012–2018), Jean Monet Fellow at the European University Institute (2001–2002), The 21st Century COE Program Fellow at Hokkaido University (2007), Fernand Braudel Senior Fellow at European University Institute (2009–2010) and a visiting fellow at Collegio Carlo Alberto (2010 and 2014).

Ekiert is also Senior Faculty Associate at the Davis Center for Russian and Eurasian Studies, Ukrainian Research Institute, Weatherhead Center for International Affairs, Ash Center for Democratic Governance and Innovation at the Kennedy School of Government, Harvard University. He is also a member of the Club of Madrid Advisory Committee and a founding member of the Concilium Civitas and Collegium Civitas in Warsaw, Poland. He is a member of several advisory boards in social sciences research institutions and NGOs.

== Research and writing ==
His teaching and research interests focus on comparative politics, regime change and democratization, civil society and social movements, and East European politics and societies. His ongoing work explores patterns of civil society development in new democracies in Central Europe and East Asia, the state of democracy in postcommunist world, the EU membership impact on post-communist democracies, and state mobilized contention in authoritarian and hybrid regimes.

His book Rebellious Civil Society: Popular Protest and Democratic Consolidation in Poland (1999), written jointly with Jan Kubik, was awarded the Orbis Book prize by the American Association for the Advancement of Slavic Studies.

He edited the special journal issues of East European Politics and Societies (on the EU Eastward Enlargement with Jan Zielonka in 2003, and on Democracy in Postcommunist World in 2007) and of Taiwan Journal of Democracy (2012).

== Selected publications ==
=== Books ===
- The State Against Society: Political Crises and Their Aftermath in East Central Europe, Princeton University Press 1996
- Rebellious Civil Society. Popular Protest and Democratic Consolidation in Poland (co-author Jan Kubik), University of Michigan Press 1999
- Ruling by Other Means: State-Mobilized Movements (co-editors Elizabeth J. Perry and Yan Xiaojun), Cambridge University Press 2020

=== Edited books ===
- Capitalism and Democracy in Central and Eastern Europe: Assessing the Legacy of Communist Rule (co-editor Stephen Hanson), Cambridge University Press, 2003

=== Articles and book chapters ===
- "Contentious Politics in New Democracies: Hungary, the former East Germany, Poland and Slovakia" (co-author Jan Kubik), World Politics, 50.4 (1998), pp. 547–581
- "The State after State Socialism: Poland in Comparative Perspective," in: The Nation-State in Question, ed. John Hall and John Ikenberry, Princeton University Press 2003, pp. 291–320.
- "Introduction: Academic Boundaries and Path Dependencies Facing The EU's Eastward Enlargement" (co-author Jan Zielonka), East European Politics and Societies, special issue (2003), pp. 2–19.
- "Democracy in Postcommunist World: An Unending Quest" (co-authors Jan Kubik and Milada Anna Vachudova), East European Politics and Societies, 21.1 (2007), pp. 1–24.
- "Dilemmas of Europeanization: Eastern and Central Europe after the EU Enlargement", Acta Slavica Iaponica, 25 (2008), pp. 1–28
- "The End of Communism in Central and Eastern Europe: The Last Middle Class Revolution?", Political Power and Social Theory, 21 (2010), pp. 99–123.
- "Democracy in Central and Eastern Europe 100 Years On" (co-author Daniel Ziblatt), East European Politics and Societies, 27.1 (2013), pp. 88–105
- "Myths and Realities of Civil Society" (co-author Jan Kubik), Journal of Democracy, 25.1 (2014), pp. 46–58.
- “Three Generations of Research on Post-Communist Politics – A Sketch”, in East European Politics and Societies, 29.2 (2015), pp. 323–337.
- "Civil Society and Three Dimensions of Inequality in Post-1989 Poland" (co-authors Jan Kubik and Michal Wenzel), Comparative Politics, 49.3 (2017), pp. 331–350
- "The Study of Protest Politics in Eastern and Central Europe in the Search of Theory" (co-author Jan Kubik), in Routledge Handbook of East European Politics, ed. Adam Fagan and Petr Kopecky, Routledge 2018, pp. 197–211.
- "Civil Society Approach", in Handbook of Political, Social, and Economic Transformations, ed. Wolfgang Merkel, Raj Kollmorgen and Hans-Jurgen Wagener, Oxford University Press 2019, pp. 151–160
- "Civil Society as a Threat to Democracy,” in The Power of Populism and People, ed. Nathan Stoltzfus and Chris Osmar, Bloomsbury Academic, London 2021, pp. 53–71.
- "Democracy and Authoritarianism in the Twenty-First Century", in Post-Pandemic Features: Sociology of Crisis Experience in Central and Eastern Europe, ed. Kaja Gadowska and Anna Giza, Brill Publishers 2024, pp. 215–230.
