= Central European Forum =

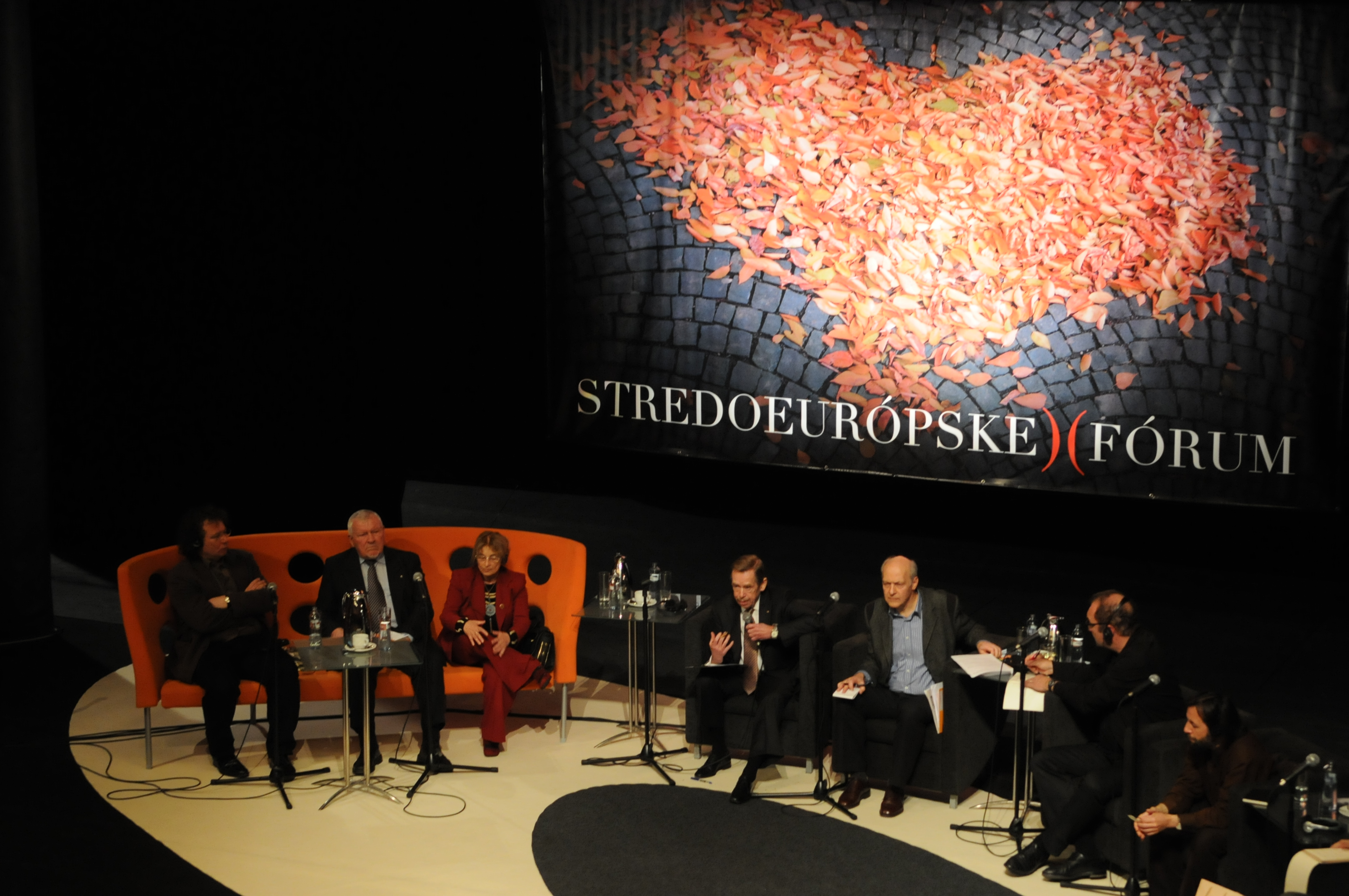
Ingo Schulze, Miroslav Kusý, Ágnes Heller, Václav Havel, Jacques Rupnik, Robert Menasse, Krzysztof Czyzewski - Central European Forum 2009

Central European Forum is an international venue organized by the non-profit organization Project Forum, held in Bratislava, Slovakia.

Its main activity is concentrated around a panel discussion attended by expert speakers from all over the world, which is open to the general public. The first Central European Forum (2009) managed to gather 25 outstanding personalities including writers (as the Russian Viktor Erofeyev, German Ingo Schulze, Austrian Robert Menasse, Hungarian György Konrád), historians (as the US Professors Timothy D. Snyder and Marci Shore), political scientists (the French and Czech Jacques Rupnik, Slovak Professor and Charter 77 spokesman Miroslav Kusý, British Professor Mary Kaldor), philosophers (the Hungarian Professor Ágnes Heller), NGO leaders (the US NGO-leader Wendy Luers), politicians (Václav Havel, Karl zu Schwarzenberg, the Belgian EEP President Wilfried Martens and the Slovak ex-finance minister and current EBRD vice-president Brigita Schmögnerová) and journalists (such as the polish journalist, historian and dissident Adam Michnik, the founder and editor-in-chief of Gazeta Wyborcza). Four main themes were discussed by the panelists under the general slogan “What happened to democracy?”: Where does the West begin?; Open society in crisis; Totalitarian Structures - A new lease of life; and Democracy fatigue.

Stated main goal of Central European Forum 2009 was to use the anniversary of the Velvet Revolution to engage in a serious and open-minded debate that will have a lasting, positive effect on the intellectual discourse in the countries of Central and Eastern Europe. Secondary goals are to (a) connect and confront intellectuals from former communist countries of Central and Eastern Europe with those coming from the West; in the face of approaching democracy fatigue and booming populism in the region, (b) promote values of democracy, human rights, tolerance and solidarity; and (c) formulate innovative ideas that would help Central Europe to overcome problems related to political issues and the global economic crisis. Complete video footage is available on the website.

Central European Forum 2010 will take place in November 2010 in Bratislava. Its main theme will be "Holding on to our freedom".
