= 2017 in architecture =

The year 2017 in architecture included the demolishment of a major brutalist building, several dedications and openings of new buildings, and two major disasters.

== Events ==
- January 19 – The Plasco Building in Tehran (Iran) collapses during a fire.
- May – The Fogarty Building, a "mammoth of modern Brutalist architecture" in Providence, Rhode Island built in the 1960s and abandoned since 2003, is demolished to make room for a hotel
- June 14 – The Grenfell Tower fire in London forces major reviews of public housing tower block construction in the United Kingdom
- November 15–17 – The annual World Architecture Festival is held in Berlin.

== Buildings and structures ==
Belgium

- May 25 – NATO headquarters in Haren, Brussels, designed by Skidmore, Owings & Merrill, dedicated

Brazil

- January – The Children's Village at the Canuanã School, Formoso do Araguaia, Tocantins, designed by Rosenbaum + Aleph Zero (Gustavo Utrabo and Pedro Duschenes), completed

China

- October – Tianjin Binhai Library, designed by MVRDV, opened
- December 2 – Sea World Culture and Arts Center in Shekou, designed by Fumihiko Maki, opened
- Ping An Finance Centre in Shenzhen, the second tallest building in China and the 4th tallest building in the world, is completed

France

- April 22 – La Seine Musicale concert venue in Paris, design co-ordinated by Jean Nouvel, inaugurated

Germany

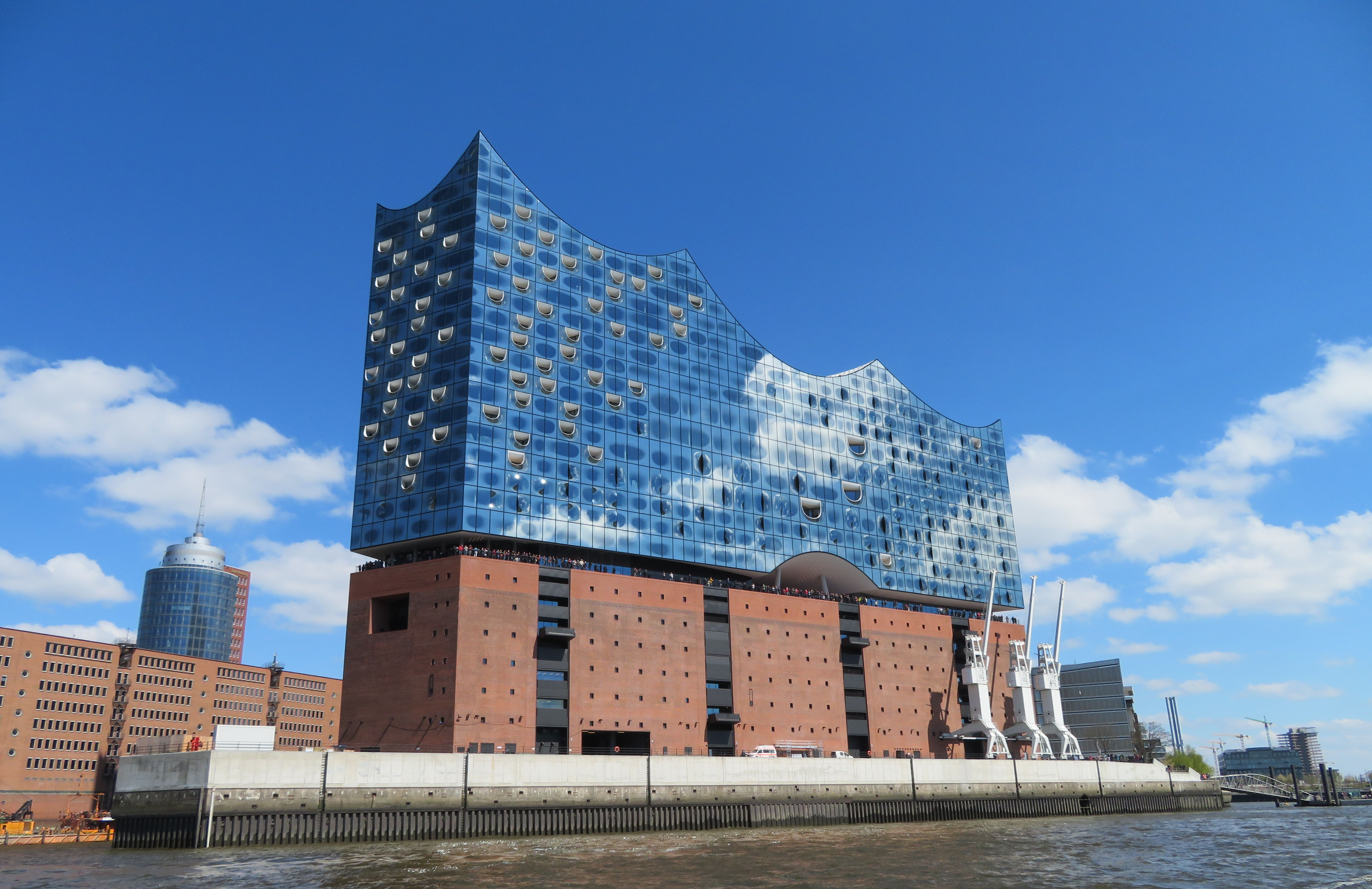
Elbphilharmonie in Hamburg, Germany

- January 11 – Elbphilharmonie concert hall in Hamburg, designed by Herzog & de Meuron, opened
- October 31 – Reconstruction of the baroque Garrison Church tower in Potsdam projected for completion on the 500th anniversary of Reformation Day

South Africa

- September 22 – Zeitz Museum of Contemporary Art Africa in Cape Town, converted from a grain silo by Thomas Heatherwick, opened

Spain

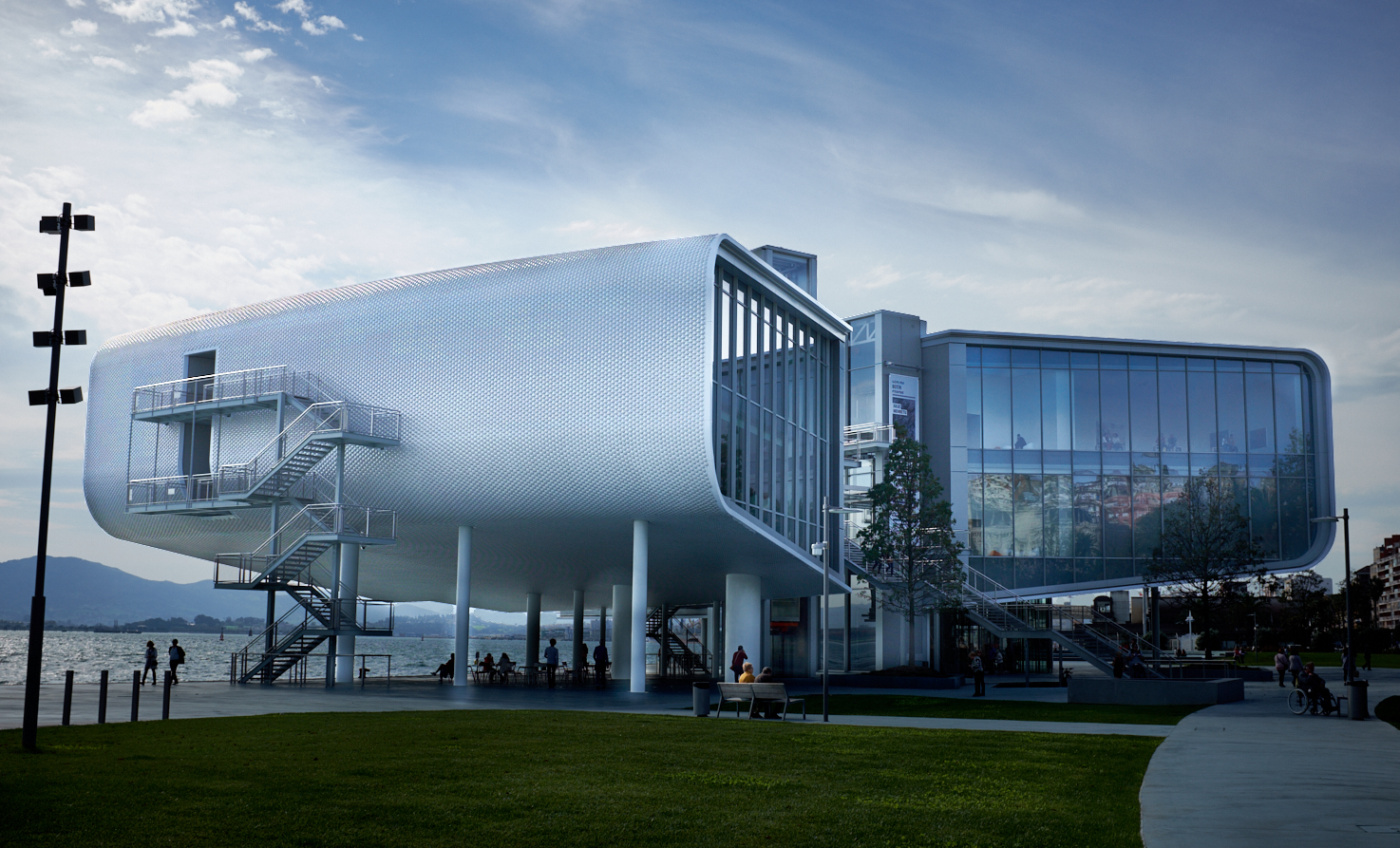
Centro Botín in Santander, Spain

- Early – Món Casteller. The Human Towers Experience in Valls (Province of Tarragona): museum dedicated to Intangible Heritage of UNESCO: the castell
- June 23 – Centro Botín de Arte y Cultura in Santander, designed by Renzo Piano, opens to the public

United Arab Emirates

- November 11 – Louvre Abu Dhabi, an art museum in Abu Dhabi designed by Jean Nouvel, opened

United Kingdom

- Early – West Court, Jesus College, Cambridge, designed by Niall McLaughlin Architects, first phase completed
- February – Berkshire House (private home) near Caversham, Reading, designed by Gregory Phillips Architects, completed
- February 14 – Nucleus, Wick, Caithness, Scotland, designed by Reiach and Hall Architects, opened
- March – Leatare Quad at Lady Margaret Hall, Oxford, designed by John Simpson Architects, completed
- March 18 – Cohen Quad for Exeter College, Oxford, designed by Alison Brooks Architects, opened
- May – Sibson Building, University of Kent, Canterbury, designed by Penoyre & Prasad, opened
- May 16 – Big Data Institute, University of Oxford, designed by Make Architects, opened
- June – NGS Macmillan Unit, Chesterfield Royal Hospital, designed by The Manser Practice, opened
- June 29 – New entrance, courtyard and gallery for Victoria and Albert Museum in London designed by Amanda Levete's AL A
- Summer – Black House (private home), Great Chart, Kent, designed by Andy Ramus (AR Design Studio), completed
- September 27 – GlaxoSmithKline Carbon Neutral Laboratory, University of Nottingham, designed by Fairhursts Design Group, opened
- October 18 – Sultan Nazrin Shah Centre at Worcester College, Oxford, designed by Níall McLaughlin Architects, opened
- October 24 – Bloomberg London European headquarters, designed by Foster and Partners, opened; awarded 2018 Stirling Prize
- October 28 – Lombard Wharf (residential tower), Battersea, London, designed by Patel Taylor, completed
- November 1 – New (sunken) library, The Queen's College, Oxford, designed by Rick Mather Architects, opened
- December 13 – New Embassy of the United States, London, designed by KieranTimberlake, opened to public
- 15 Clerkenwell Close, London, designed by Amin Taha for himself, completed
- Baltimore Tower in London Docklands designed by Skidmore, Owings & Merrill
- Caring Wood (private home), Leeds, Kent, designed by James Macdonald Wright of Macdonald Wright Architects and Niall Maxwell, completed
- Redesdale (private home), Boars Hill, Oxford, designed by Khoury Architects, completed
- No. 37 (private home), Belfast, Northern Ireland, designed by Family Architects
- Vex House, Stoke Newington, London, designed by Chance De Silva
- Two Fifty One, a mixed-use development in Elephant and Castle, London, designed by Allies and Morrison, completed
- Bushey Cemetery for United Synagogue, designed by Waugh Thistleton, completed

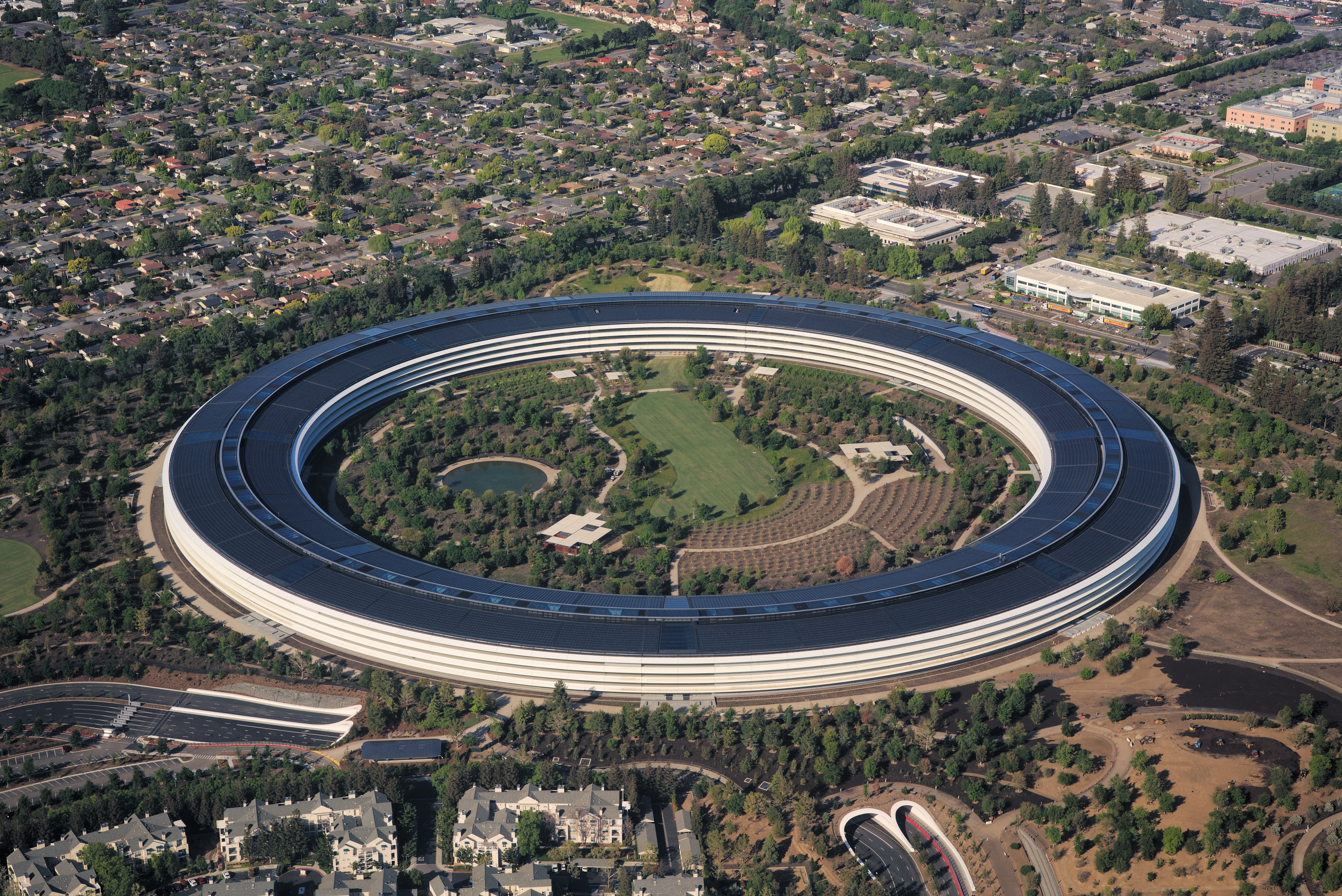
Apple Park in Cupertino, California, USA

United States

- Spring - The John W. Olver Design Building at the University of Massachusetts Amherst in Amherst, Massachusetts designed by Leers Weinzapfel Associates opens
- April – Apple Park in Cupertino, California, designed by Norman Foster, opens
- October 20 – Engineering Research Center, Brown University, designed by KieranTimberlake, opens
- November – Museum of the Bible in Washington D.C., designed by David Greenbaum, opens

== Exhibitions ==
- April 25 until July 30 - "Berlin/Los Angeles: Space for Music" at the Getty Research Institute in Los Angeles, California.

== Awards ==
- AIA Gold Medal – Paul Revere Williams
- Architecture Firm Award AIA – Leddy Maytum Stacy Architects
- Carbuncle Cup – PLP Architecture
- Driehaus Architecture Prize for New Classical Architecture – Robert Adam
- Emporis Skyscraper Award – Lotte World Tower
- European Union Prize for Contemporary Architecture (Mies van der Rohe Prize) – NL Architects and XVW architectuur
- Lawrence Israel Prize – Karim Rashid
- Praemium Imperiale Architecture Laureate – Rafael Moneo
- Pritzker Architecture Prize – Rafael Aranda, Carme Pigem, and Ramón Vilalta / RCR Arquitectes
- RAIA Gold Medal – Peter Elliott
- RIBA Royal Gold Medal – Paulo Mendes da Rocha, Brazil
- RIBA Stirling Prize – dRMM Architects for Hastings Pier
- Thomas Jefferson Medal in Architecture – Yvonne Farrell and Shelley McNamara
- Twenty-five Year Award AIA – Grand Louvre—Phase I by Pei Cobb Freed & Partners
- UIA Gold Medal – Toyo Ito
- Vincent Scully Prize – Laurie Olin

== Deaths ==
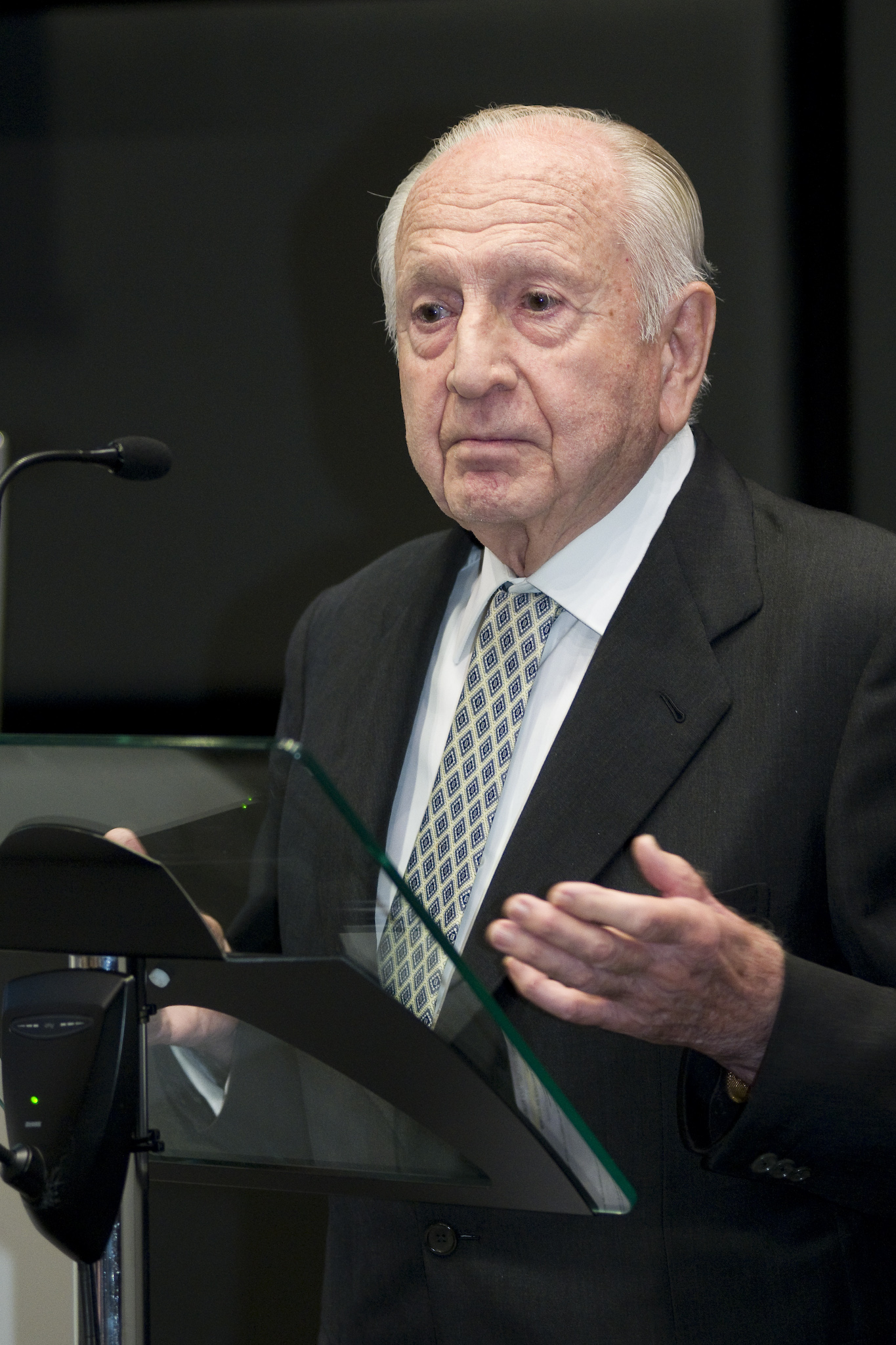
Antonio Lamela

- January 5 – Leonardo Benevolo, Italian architectural historian (b. 1923)
- March 5 – Leonard Manasseh, British architect (b. 1916)
- March 7 – Slavko Brezovski, Macedonian architect (b. 1922)
- March 10 – Christopher Gray, American journalist and architectural historian (b. 1950)
- March 17 – Hugh Hardy, American architect (b. 1932)
- April 1 – Antonio Lamela, Spanish architect (b. 1926)
- May 2 – Diane Lewis, American architect, author and academic (b. 1951)
- July 1 – Richard Gilbert Scott, English architect (b. 1923)
- July 4 – Bryan Avery, English architect (b. 1944)
- August 15 – Gunnar Birkerts, 92, Latvian-born American architect (b. 1925)
- September 1 – Gin D. Wong, 94, Chinese-born American architect (b. 1922)
- September 9 – Otto Meitinger, 90, German architect and preservationist (b. 1929)
- September 15 – Albert Speer Jr., 83, German architect (b. 1934)
- September 28 – Vann Molyvann, 90, Cambodian architect (b. 1926)
- October 5 – Dan Hanganu, 78, Romanian born Canadian architect (b. 1939)
- October 29 – Manfredi Nicoletti, 89, Italian architect (b.1930)
- November 30 – Vincent Scully, 97, American architectural historian (b. 1920)
- December 29 – John C. Portman Jr., American architect (Peachtree Center) (b. 1924)

== See also ==
- Timeline of architecture
