= Campus of the University of Engineering and Technology, Lima =

University campus in Lima, Peru

University of Engineering and Technology
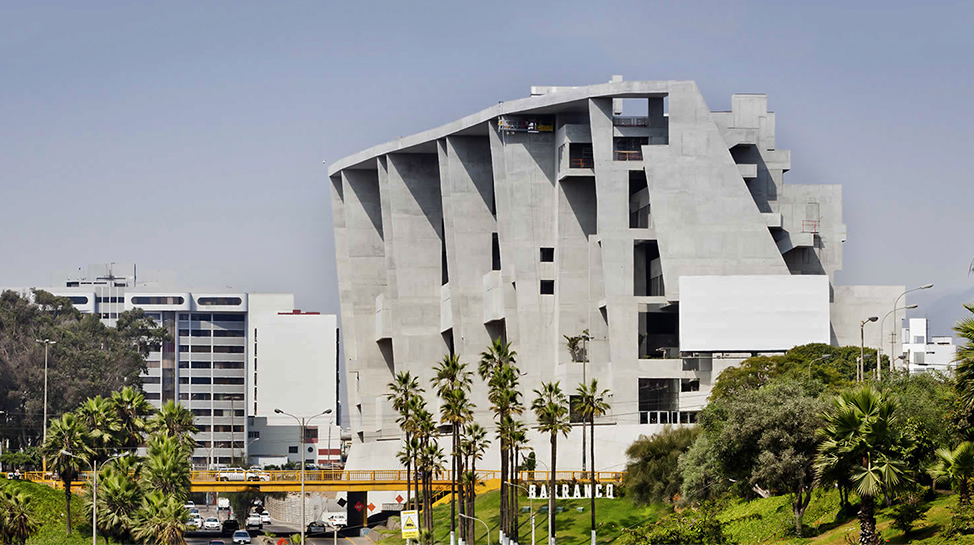
- Interactive map of the University of Engineering and Technology area

General information
- Architectural style: Brutalism
- Location: Medrano Silva 165, Barranco
- Completed: 2015
- Cost: US$ 100 million
- Owner: UTEC

Design and construction
- Architects: Yvonne Farrell, Shelley McNamara
- Architecture firm: Graña y Montero

The campus of the University of Engineering and Technology is located at the entrance of Barranco District, between the Bajada de Armendáriz, Reducto Avenue and the Paseo de la República. The building is the work of Irish architects Yvonne Farrell and Shelley McNamara of Grafton Architects, winners of the 2020 Pritzker Prize. Although it has been dubbed the "modern Machu Picchu" by supporters, the building's design has been met with controversy.

== History ==
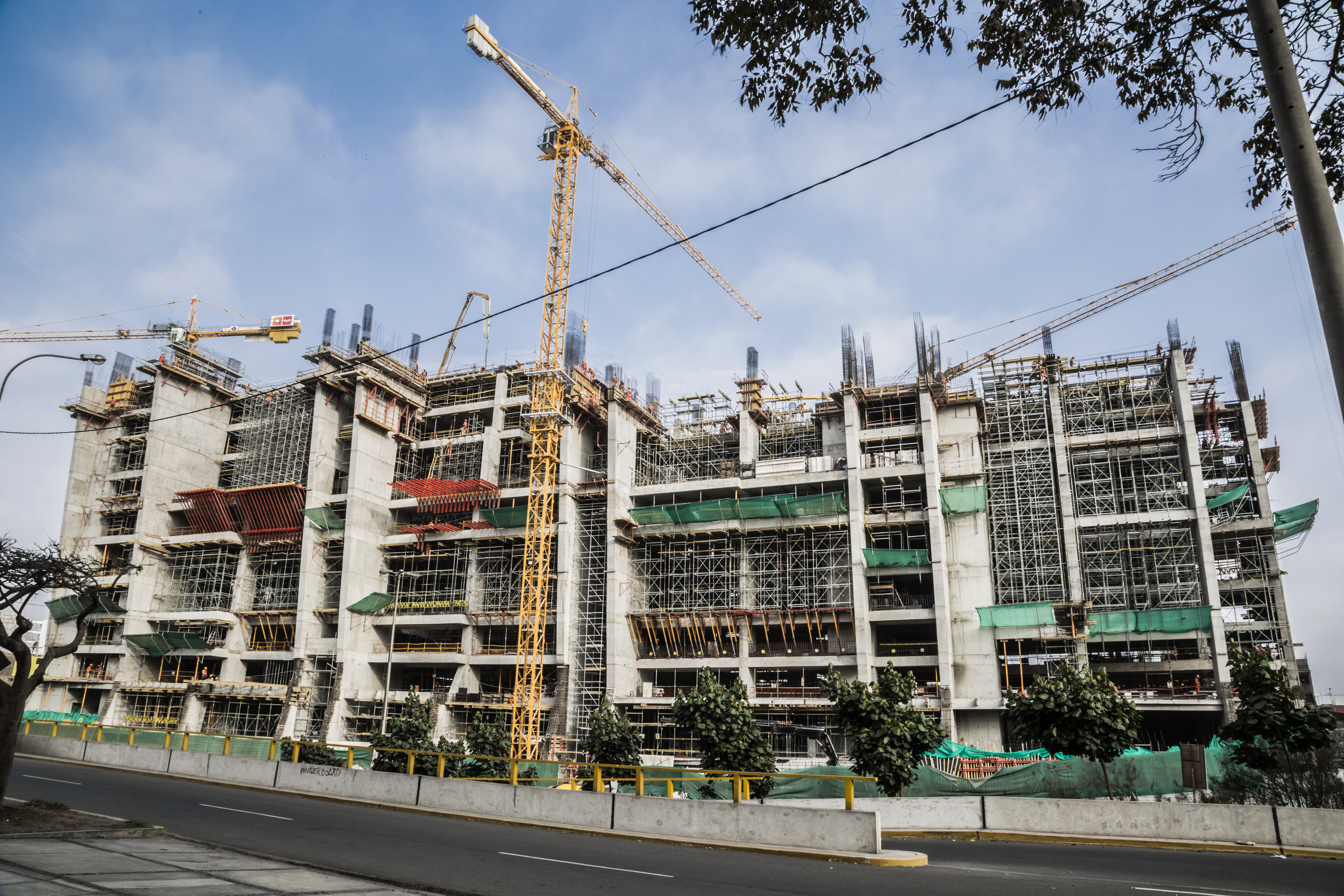
The building under construction.

The campus, built in 2015 by Graña y Montero, was designed in 2011 by the winning architects of the UTEC International Architecture Competition, the Irish Yvonne Farrell and Shelley McNamara of Grafton Architects. The project won the Silver Lion award at the 13th edition of the Venice Biennale of Architecture. In early 2020, Farrell and McNamara were recognized with the Pritzker Prize for their architectural work.

The brutalist building had a budget of US$ 100 million for its construction. Its design and location have been met with controversy and criticism, as its "unfinished appearance" has been criticised and compared to the works built during Juan Velasco Alvarado's so-called revolutionary government.

The building is surrounded by the Bajada Armendáriz, Paseo de la República and Reducto avenues, and Medrano Silva and Enrique Barrón streets.

== See also ==
- University of Engineering and Technology (Peru)
