= 2020 in architecture =

The year 2020 in architecture involved some significant architectural events and new buildings.

== Events ==
- November 16 – Work to dismantle the flanking walls of a pavilion erected by Tadao Ando at Piccadilly Gardens in Manchester city centre in England (2002) begins.

== Buildings and structures ==
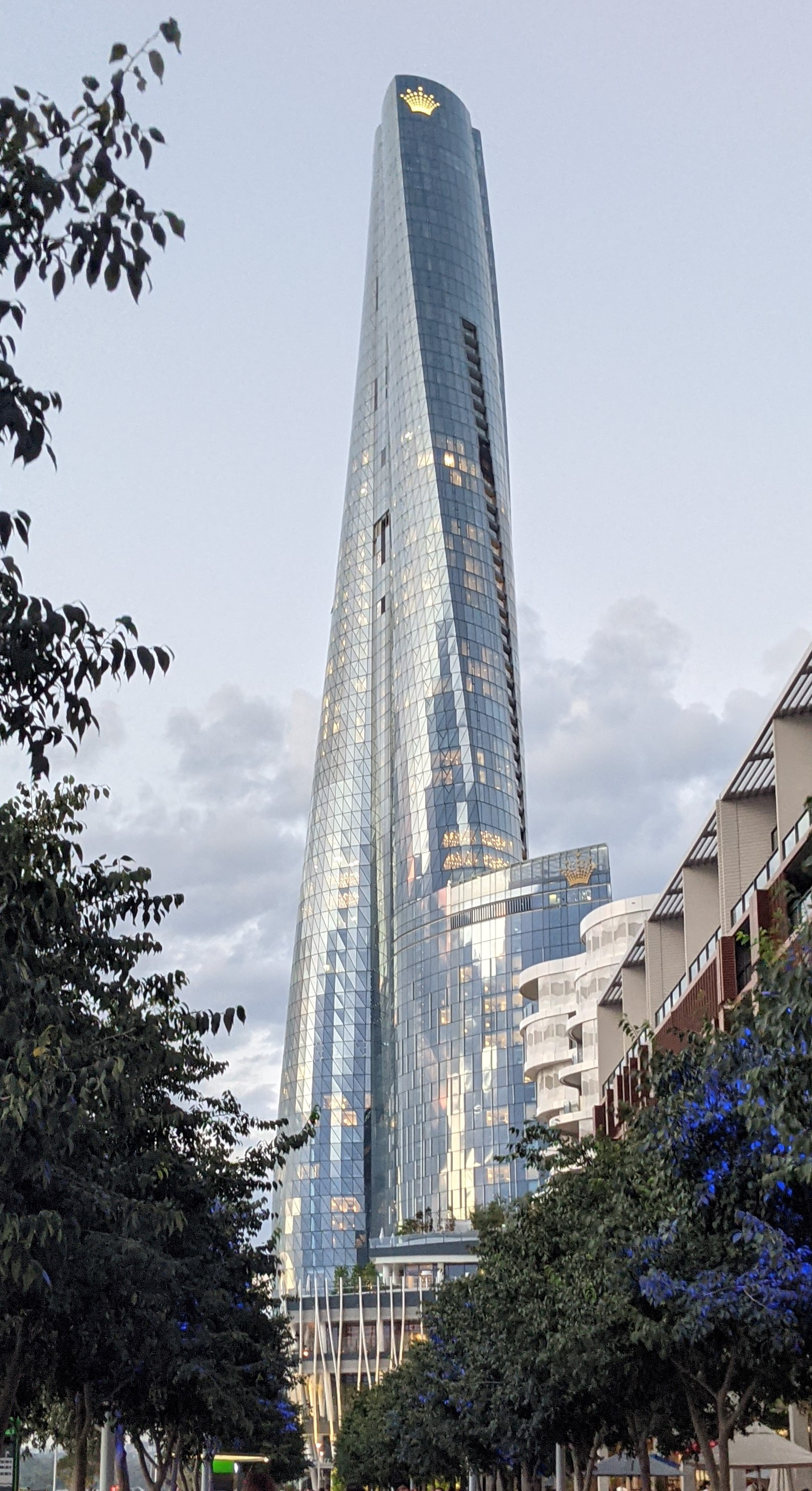
Crown Sydney

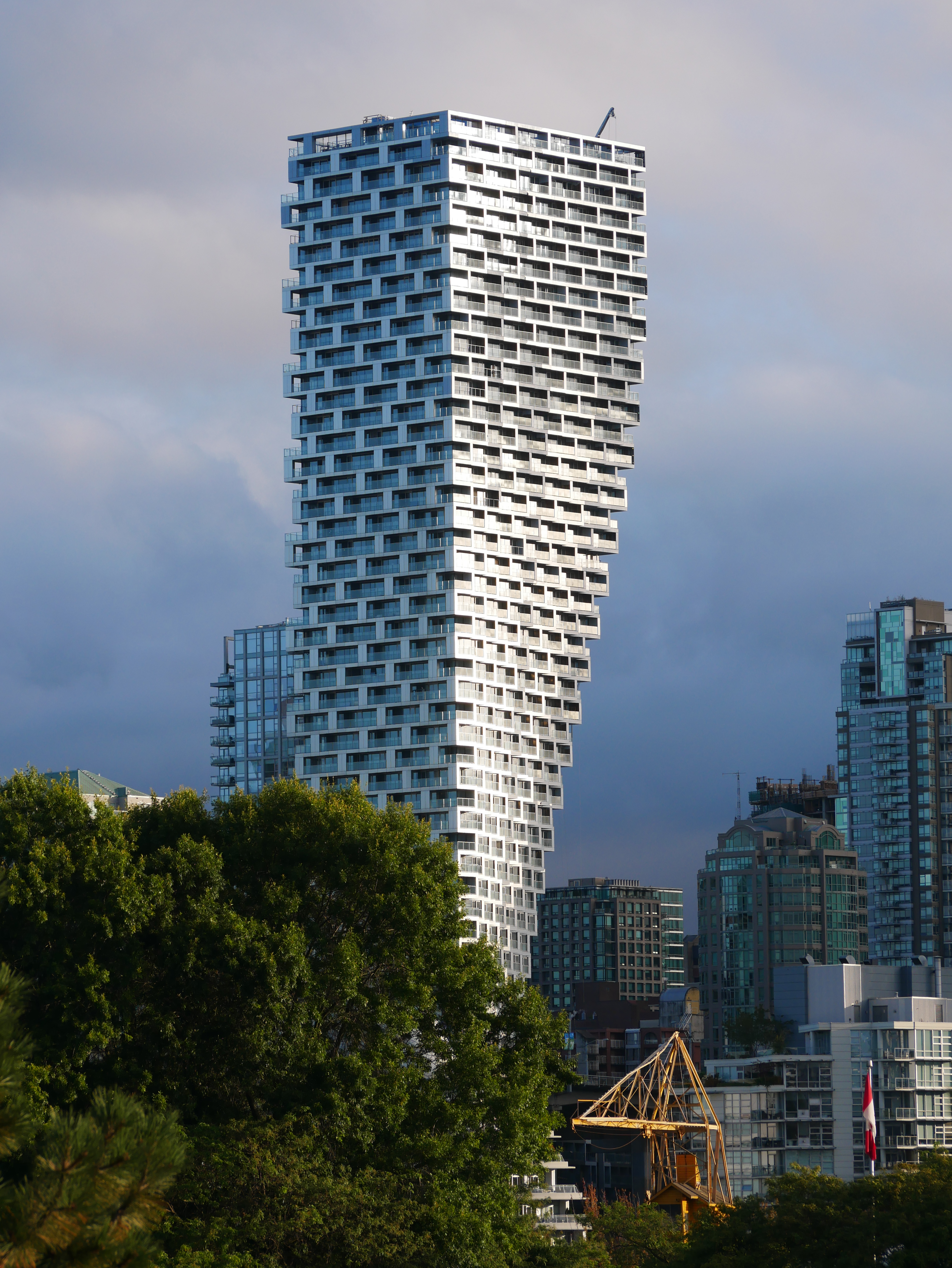
Vancouver House

Australia

- Australia 108, the tallest building in Melbourne, completed.
- Crown Sydney, the tallest building in Sydney, completed.

Belgium

- Alex guesthouse (private garden building), Berlare, designed by Atelier Vens Vanbelle, completed.

Canada

- Vancouver House, designed by Bjarke Ingels.

Germany

- Berlin Brandenburg Airport completed and opened on 31 October.

Hong Kong

- M+ museum scheduled for completion.

India

- World One in Mumbai, the tallest building in India, is completed.

Italy

- Genoa-Saint George Bridge by Renzo Piano, over the Polcevera River in Genoa, replacing the Ponte Morandi which collapsed in 2018, completed and open to traffic on 3 August.

Japan

- The Kadokawa Culture Museum at Tokorozawa Sakura Town in Tokorozawa, Japan partially opened on 1 August and then fully opened on 6 November.

Lebanon

- Stone Garden (apartments), Beirut, designed by Lina Gotmeh, completed.

Mexico

- Torres Obispado in Monterrey, the tallest skyscraper in Latin America, completed.
- 'OUM Wellness', built by the consortium Edificios Cero Energía in San Pedro Garza García, Nuevo León, the first net-zero energy building (NZEB) in Latin America.

Norway

- Powerhouse Telemark, "energy positive" project in Porsgrunn designed by Snøhetta.

People's Republic of China

- Nanjing Zendai Himalayas Center, designed by Ma Yansong.
- 1000 Trees, designed by Thomas Heatherwick in Shanghai.
- "Crystal" skyway at Raffles City Chongqing, designed by Moshe Safdie, opened to public June.

Sweden

- Norra Tornen, a pair of residential buildings in Stockholm designed by OMA, is completed

Taiwan

- Tainan Spring (adaptive reuse), Tainan, designed by MVRDV, completed.

United Arab Emirates

- The Opus, Dubai, including a boutique hotel with interiors designed by Zaha Hadid.
- Singapore Pavilion at Expo 2020 in Dubai.

United Kingdom

- 100 Liverpool Street office redevelopment in the City of London, designed by Hopkins Architects.
- Hackney New Primary School and 333 Kingsland Road (apartments), East London, designed by Henley Halebrown, completed.
- Newfoundland Quay diagrid skyscraper rental apartments in London Docklands, designed by Horden Cherry Lee, projected for completion.
- Town House, combining a library and dance studios, Kingston University London, designed by Grafton Architects (Shelley McNamara and Yvonne Farrell), opened to students 6 January.
- Wolfson Building, John Radcliffe Hospital, Oxford, designed by Francis-Jones Morehen Thorp (fjmt), opened 5 March.
- Falkirk Campus, Forth Valley College, Scotland, designed by Reiach & Hall, officially opened January.

== Awards ==
- AIA Gold Medal – Marlon Blackwell (U.S.)
- Architecture Firm Award AIA – Architecture Research Office
- Driehaus Architecture Prize for New Classical Architecture – Ong-ard Satrabhandhu
- Grand Prix de l'urbanisme –
- Grand Prix national de l'architecture –
- LEAF Award, Overall Winner – Postponed until October 2021
- Praemium Imperiale Architecture Laureate –
- Pritzker Architecture Prize – Yvonne Farrell and Shelley McNamara
- RAIA Gold Medal – John Wardle
- RIAS Award for Architecture – cancelled due to the COVID-19 pandemic
- RIBA Royal Gold Medal – Grafton Architects (Shelley McNamara and Yvonne Farrell)
- Stirling Prize – RIBA announced that the Stirling Prize awards had been postponed until 2021 due to the COVID-19 pandemic.
- Thomas Jefferson Medal in Architecture – WEISS/MANFREDI
- Twenty-five Year Award AIA – Eric Owen Moss Architects for Conjunctive Points – The New City

== Exhibitions ==
- 20 February until 14 August – Rem Koolhaas and AMO: "Countryside; the Future" at the Solomon R. Guggenheim Museum in New York City.

== Deaths ==
- February 21 – Yona Friedman, 96, Hungarian-born French architect and architectural theorist ("mobile architecture") (born 1923)
- March 15 – Vittorio Gregotti, 92, Italian architect (born 1927)
- March 26 – Michael Sorkin, 71, American architect (born 1948)
- March 28 – Michael McKinnell, 84, American architect (born 1935)
- April 4 – Bashirul Haq, 77, Bangladeshi architect (born 1942)
- April 10 – Rifat Chadirji, 93, Iraqi architect (born 1926)
- April 12 – Justus Dahinden, 94, Swiss architect, teacher and writer (born 1925)
- August 4 – Jean-Marc Bonfils, 57, Lebanese architect (born 1963)
- September 2 – Christian Liaigre, 77, French architect and interior designer (born 1943)
- December 27 – Vikram Lall - Indian architect (Akshardham temple), (Birthdate not disclosed)
- December 29 – Luigi Snozzi, 88, Swiss architect (born 1963)

== See also ==
- Timeline of architecture
