= University of Engineering and Technology (Peru) =

Private university in Peru

Coordinates: 12.1352°S 77.0222°W

UTEC
- Universidad de Ingeniería y Tecnología
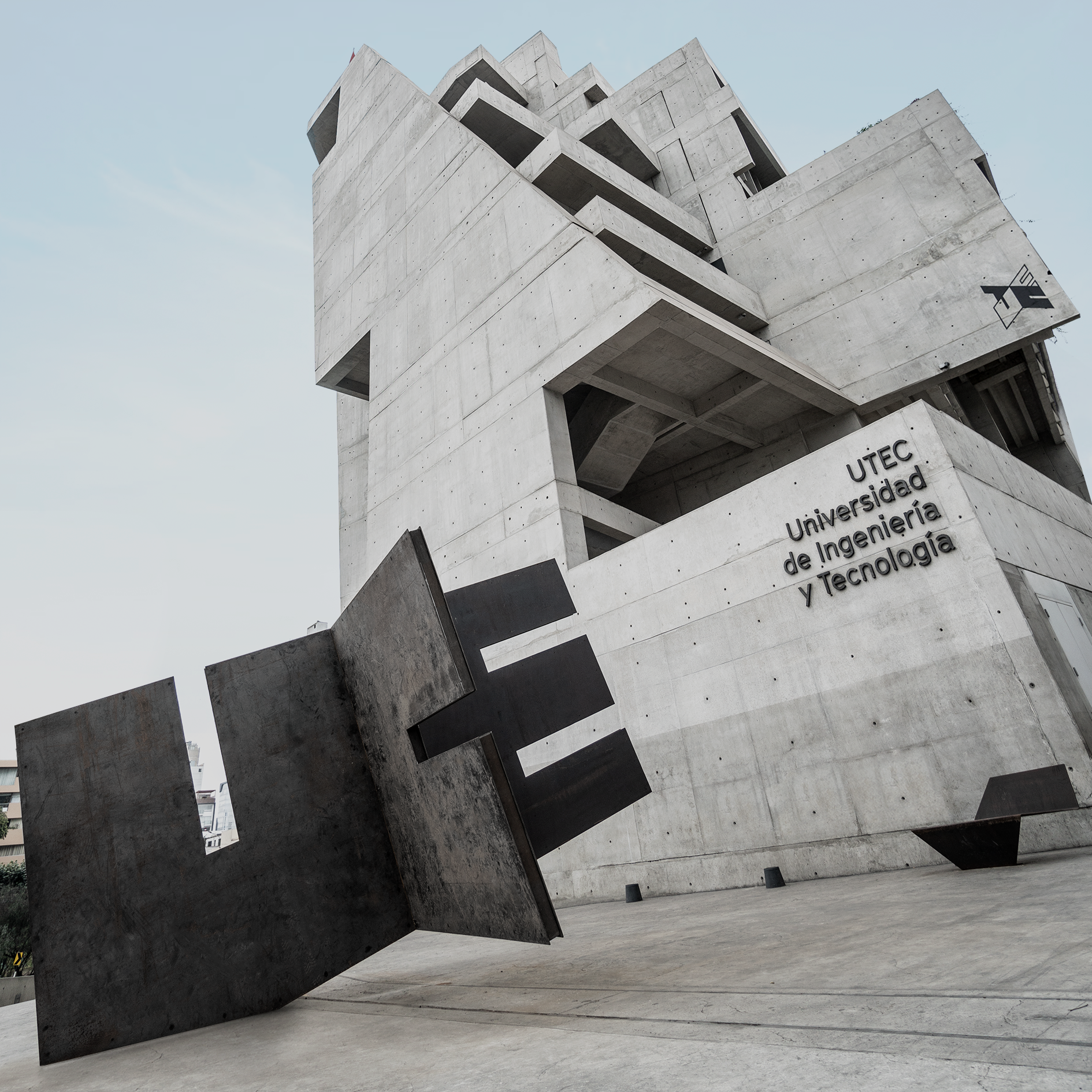
- Motto: Scientia et praxis
- Type: Private
- Established: September 1, 2011
- Founder: Eduardo Hochschild
- Location: Jr. Medrano Silva 165, Barranco 15063, Peru, Lima, Peru
- Campus: Urban
- Website: utec.edu.pe
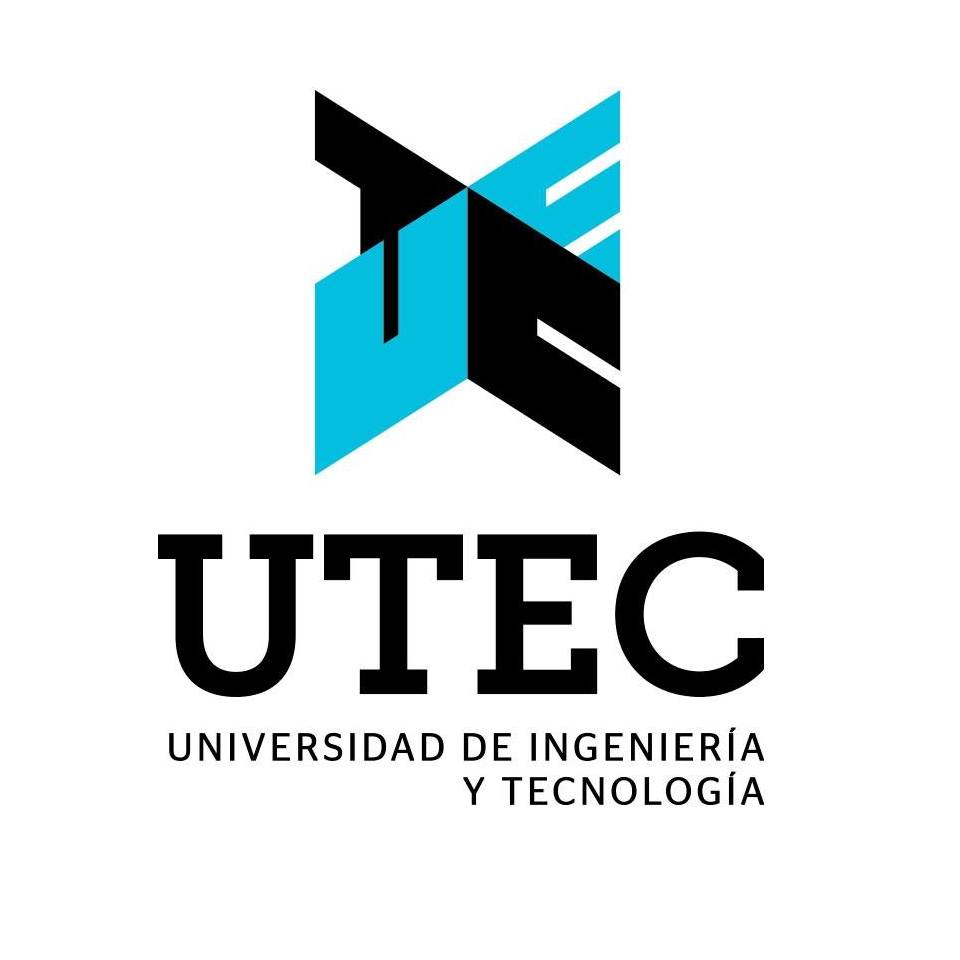

The University of Engineering and Technology (UTEC) Universidad de Ingeniería y Tecnología is a private university in Lima in Peru. Its main buildings were designed by Irish architects Yvonne Farrell and Shelley McNamara, and won the "Silver Lion" at the 13th Venice Biennale.

== History ==
It is a private university in Lima, Peru. Its campus is located in the district of Barranco.

The University of Engineering and Technology was founded on September 1, 2011, by the Peruvian engineer and businessman Eduardo Hochschild, leader of the Hochschild Group.

The construction of the UTEC was carried out on the remains of the huaca "La Viñita", the last pre-Columbian archaeological vestige of Barranco, which was located at the intersection of the Quebrada de Armendáriz and the Vía Expresa, covering some 5000 m².

It opened in 2012 and its founders intended that it would be disruptive to Peru by supplying a new type of engineer.

The buildings were designed by Irish architects Yvonne Farrell and Shelley McNamara of Grafton Architects. The building was considered the best new building in 2016 and it won the "Silver Lion" award at the 13th edition of the Venice Biennale. In 2020, Farrell and McNamara received the Pritzker Prize; one of their selected works was the UTEC building.

=== First Peruvian licensed university ===
UTEC was the first university in Peru to obtain a license from the National Superintendence of Higher University Education (SUNEDU), in 2016.

== Rankings ==
In 2020, UTEC ranked in first place per capita in scientific production in Peru measured by Scopus and Web of Science.

== Education ==
The university has a cross curricular "Laboratory for Educational Innovation" which it calls Moray.
