= Celler Perelada =

Building in Peralada, Spain

Celler Perelada is a winery building in Peralada.

== Building and design ==
The Celler Perelada project was undertaken by family Suqué Mateu at a price of 40 million €. with standards aimed at achieving the improvement of the quality of its wines, returning to traditional systems. The winery was designed and building activities supervised by Rafael Aranda of RCR Arquitectes, recipients of the Pritzker Prize 2017. The ground-breaking ceremony took place in 2016 and the first vintage was in 2020. Taking advantage of the unevenness of the land, it is half-buried up to 20 metres, which favours energy saving. The deep foundation of the winery allows interaction with geothermal layers. The building has 538 supports at a depth of between 8 and 20 metres, 331 of which are used as heat exchangers with the ground to reduce the consumption of heating, cooling and hot water, thus minimising energy consumption, resulting in a saving of around 37 %. Water consumption is reduced both inside the building through the combination of efficient taps and rainwater, and outside through an efficient irrigation system and the use of rainwater for gardening.

Floor space is 18,200 square meter and provides a production capacity of over two million bottles per vintage.
