= The Children's Village at the Canuanã School =

The Children’s Village is part of the Canuanã School, located in Formoso do Araguaia, Tocantins, Brazil and the winner of the RIBA Award for International Excellence 2018 and the RIBA International Emerging Architect award for Aleph Zero. The School teachers 780 children from ages 7–17 and has been opened for 44 years. Operating as a boarding school for 540 school children run and funded by the Bradesco Foundation, the Children’s Village received the Building of the Year award in 2018 as the Best Building of Educational Architecture of the World. The architectural design was finished in January 2017 and includes 23,344 square meters of space. The architects, Aleph Zero, worked with Brazilian designer and television host, Marcelo Rosenbaum, and with the students and teachers to complete the design.
