= Peralada =

- Municipality
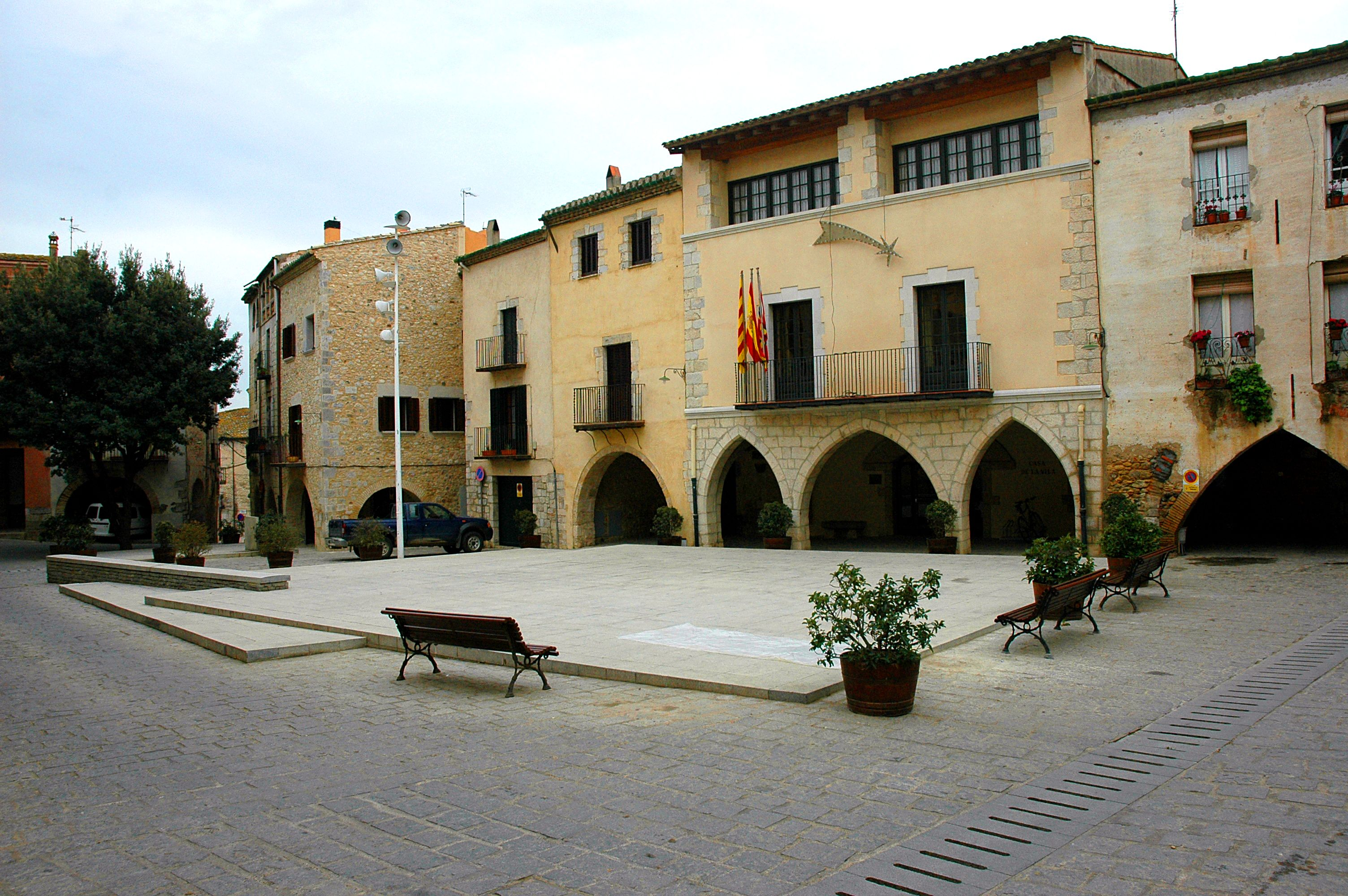

- Flag Coat of arms

- Location of Peralada in Catalonia
- Coordinates: 42°18′32″N 3°0′39″E
- Country: Spain
- Region: Catalonia
- Province: Girona
- Comarca: Alt Empordà

Government
  - Mayor: Pere Torrent Martin (2015)

Area
  - Total: 43.6 km^{2} (16.8 sq mi)
- Elevation: 100 m (330 ft)

Population (2025-01-01)
  - Total: 2,077
  - Density: 47.6/km^{2} (123/sq mi)
- Demonym: Peraladenc
- Website: peralada.cat

Peralada (Catalan pronunciation: [pəɾəˈlaðə]) is a village in the province of Girona, Catalonia, Spain. It was the home of the Frankish Counts of Peralada who controlled this portion of the Marca Hispanica before becoming part of the lands held by the Count of Barcelona.

Figueres is 6.5 km to the west, Roses 13.6 km to the south east. The N-260 to the south connects Figueres with Portbou and the French border.

The local economy is based on tourism, winemaking and dairy farming.

Since 1987 a festival of music called Festival Internacional de Música "Castell de Peralada", focused on lyrical productions and operas, has been held in Peralada.

== Main sights ==
- The castle, restored in the 19th century in French style.
- Parish church of St. Martin (18th century). Of the previous medieval edifice, the bell tower has survived.
- Convent of St. Dominic (11th century). The church interior has capitals with biblical, flower and geometrical themes.
- Church of Santa Eulàlia (15th century)
- Convent del Carme (1293), with a Gothic cloister from the 14th century
- Celler Peralada
