= Carme Pigem =

Catalan architect from Spain

Carme Pigem Barceló
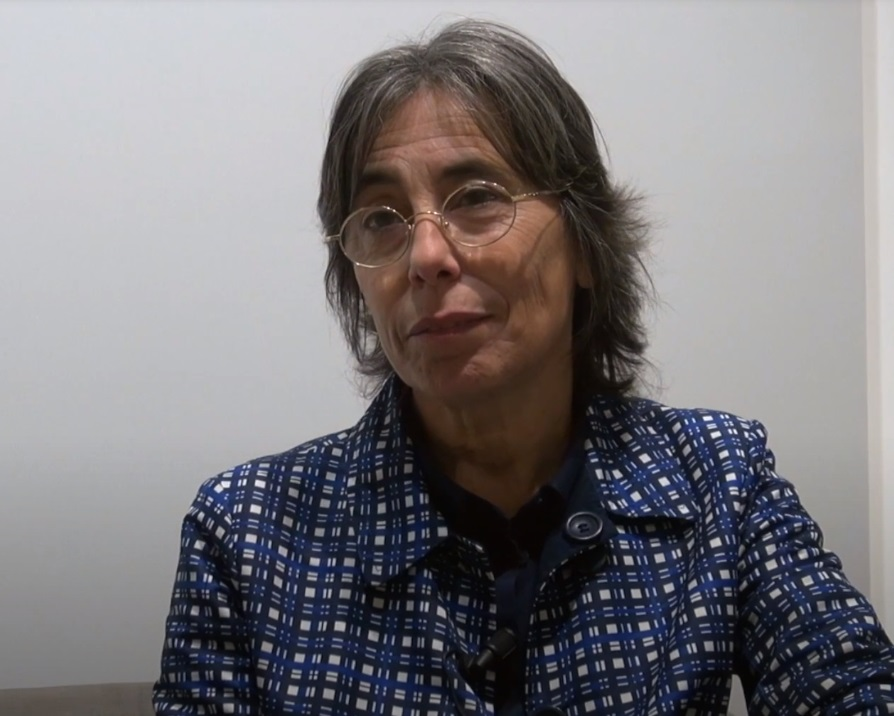
- Born: 8 April 1962 (age 64)
- Occupation: Architect

Academic work
- Discipline: Architecture
- Institutions: ETH Zurich

Carme Pigem Barceló (born Olot, 8 April 1962) is a Catalan architect, member of the Pritzker Prize-winning architectural firm RCR Arquitectes, together with Ramon Vilalta and Rafael Aranda.

== Biography ==
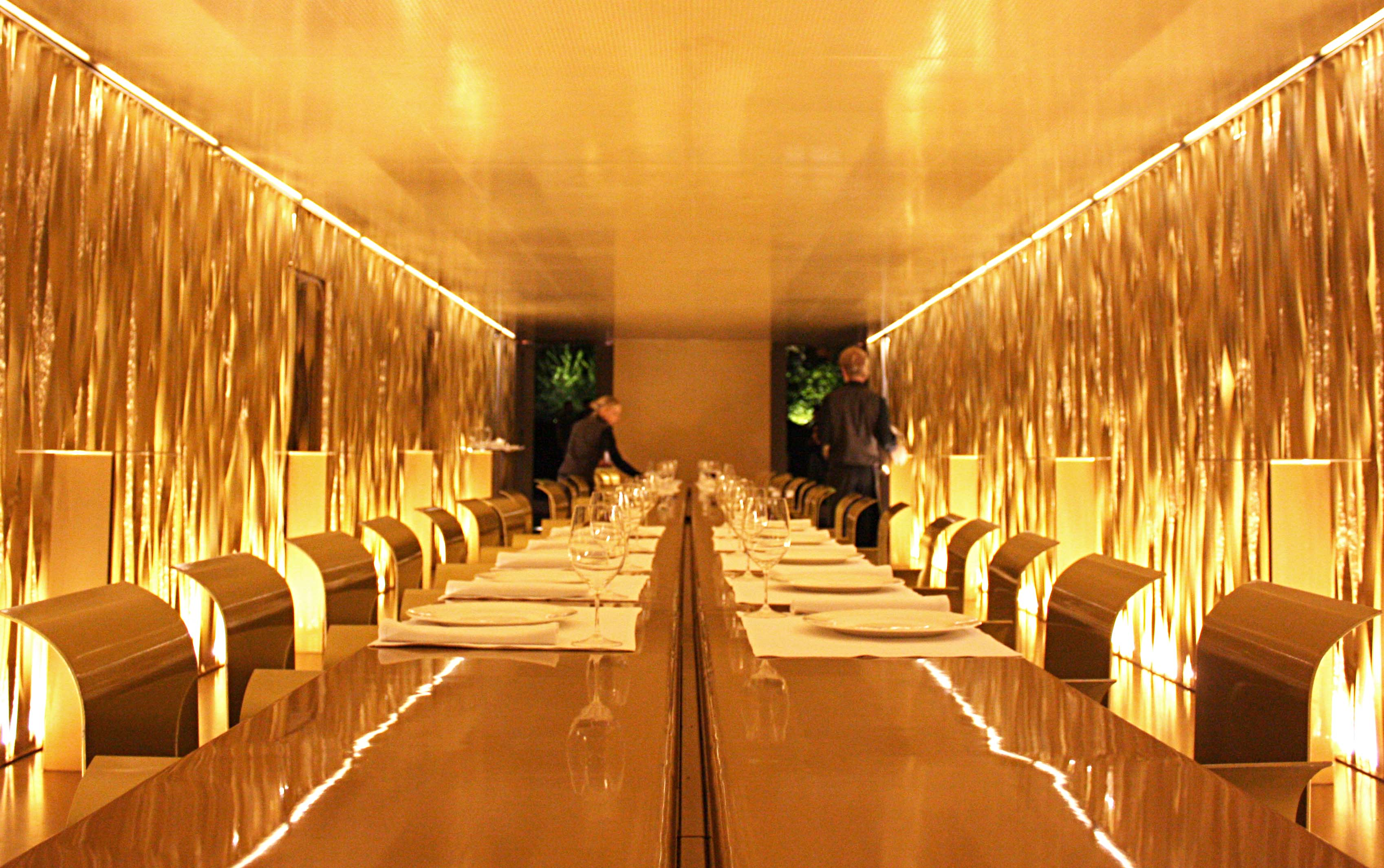
Restaurant "Les Cols"

Aranda, Pigem, and Vilalta grew up in Olot, located in t’he northern part of Catalonia. Between 1977 and 1979, they studied at the Escola d'Art i Superior de Disseny d'Olot, and in 1987 graduated in architecture at the Vallès School of Architecture (ETSA Vallès). After graduating in 1987, she returned to Olot and founded RCR Arquitectes with Ramon Vilalta and Rafael Aranda.

Between 1992 and 1999 she worked as professor of Architectural Projects at ETSA Vallès and was a member of the board of examiners for the final examinations from 1995 to 2004. From 1997 to 2003 she was professor of Architectural Projects at the Barcelona School of Architecture (ETSAB), and was a member of the board of examiners in 2003. Since 2005 she has been a visiting professor in the Department of Architecture at the Zurich Institute of Technology (ETHZ), Switzerland.

She was awarded the 2017 Pritzker Prize together with Ramon Vilalta and Rafael Aranda.

In June 2020, she and other architects, as well as chefs, Nobel laureates in Economics and leaders of international organizations, signed the appeal in favour of the purple economy (“Towards a cultural renaissance of the economy”), published in Corriere della Sera, El País and Le Monde.
