= De Krook =

City library of Gent

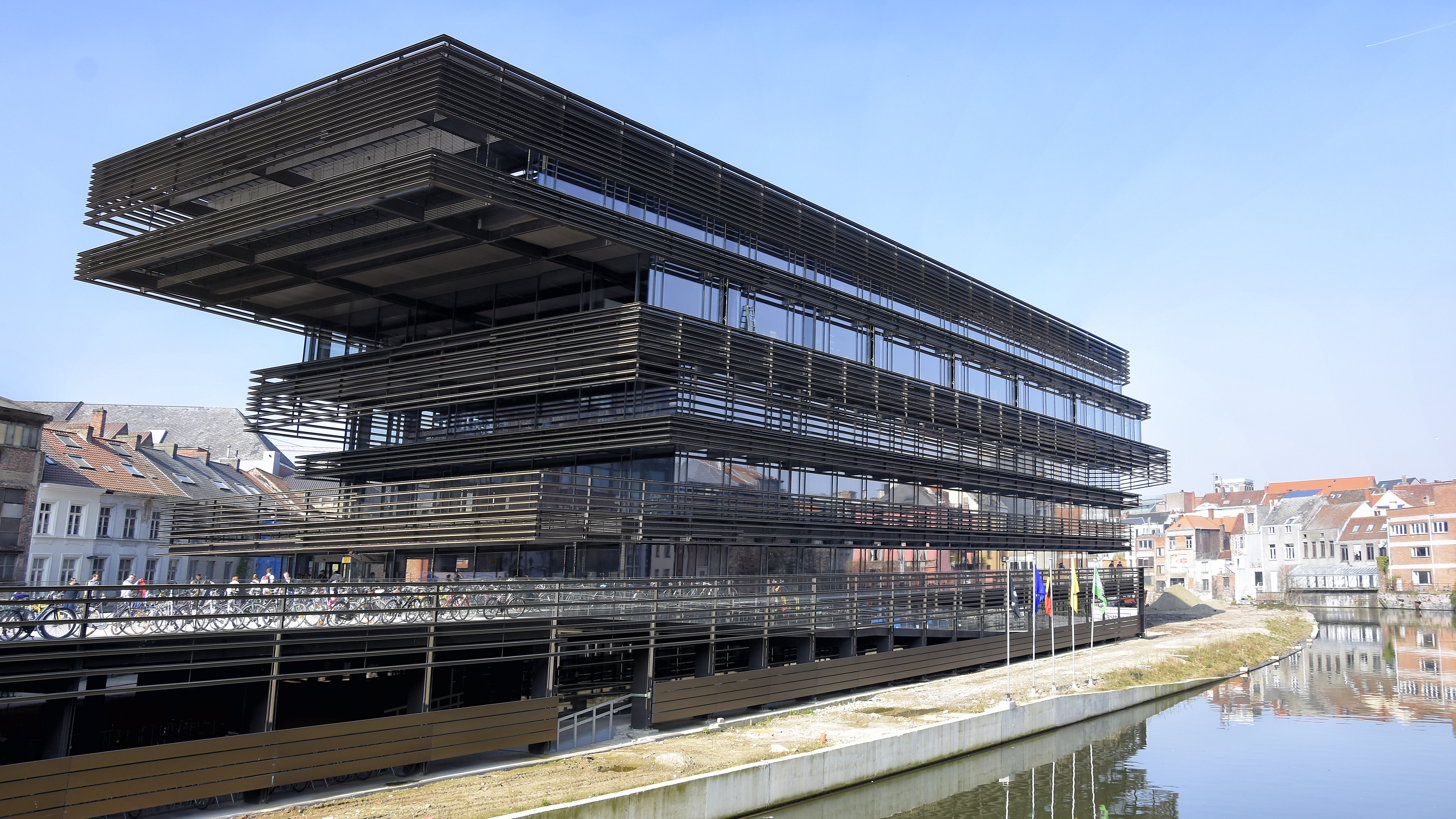
- Interactive map of the De Krook area

General information
- Type: Library
- Architectural style: Postmodern
- Location: Miriam Makebaplein 1; 9000 Ghent, Belgium
- Coordinates: 51°2′56″N 3°43′43″E
- Completed: 2018

Design and construction
- Architects: Coussée & Goris, RCR Arquitectes

References
- De Krook: Visit Gent

De Krook is a library and media center in Ghent (Dutch: Gent), East Flanders, Belgium. It is an initiative of the city of Ghent, Ghent University and IMEC, and describes itself as "a place of inspiration for knowledge, culture and innovation" in the city. The library opened its doors on 10 March 2017, though construction was not fully completed until a year later. Its name refers to the curve ("krook") of the river Scheldt that wraps around the northern and eastern sides of the site, and to its district, the Waalse Krook.

== History ==
The design competition for the new building attracted 99 entries. The design by Catalan architectural firm RCR Arquitectes in collaboration with Ghent architectural firm Coussée & Goris was chosen. The new building is part of an urban renewal project that will also include renovation of the former Winter Circus. The site was redeveloped with attention to greenery and comfort for cyclists, as the quays along the river were lowered and moorings for pleasure craft and taxi boats were built on the side of the library. Some streets in the area were also redeveloped.

Despite these benefits, the building of the library did not go ahead without controversy. In April 2018, the first part of a bridge connecting De Krook with the Brabantdam was built. In May 2016, the original route of the proposed bridge had to be changed in response to a possible violation of privacy by residents of Sint-Jansvest. In September 2018, several residents went to the Council for Permit Disputes. The Council annulled the building permit for the second part of the bridge in April 2019.

Nonetheless, in May 2018, De Krook won the Real Estate Society Award for Best (Semi-)Public Development.

== Use ==
In addition to its function as a library, the building aims to become a meeting place and offer the opportunity for visitors to discover new technologies, such as 3D printing and virtual reality, attend workshops and see library exhibitions. The collaboration with Ghent University and IMEC ensures that visitors are kept informed of the latest developments in information technology. Also Urgent.fm has its location in the building. At the back of the ground floor there is a reading café.

The library is accessible via an open square, the Miriam Makebaplein, named after the South African singer Miriam Makeba, and via a new pedestrian and cyclist bridge over the Muinkschelde, the Albertina Sisulu Bridge, named after the South African anti-apartheid fighter Albertina Sisulu. Volunteers helped to form a chain when the nearby former library on Woodrow Wilsonplein moved to the new location. In total, approximately 200,000 items in the collection had to be moved.

== Residents ==
Whereas the first three floors of De Krook are occupied by the public library, different research groups have their offices on the 4th floor. Ghent University is present with research groups imec-mict-UGent under the supervision of Prof. Dr. Lieven De Marez and with research group IPEM under the supervision of Prof. Dr. Marc Leman. The first focuses on research on human-technology interactions from an interdisciplinary perspective (communication sciences, psychology, engingeering) and the latter focuses on musical interactions and embodied music. Besides Ghent University, also the AI & Data department of IMEC and start-ups participating in the imec.istart program have their offices in De Krook.

== Tax case ==
In 2019, the Special Tax Inspectorate (BBI) demanded 11 to 14 million euros in overdue VAT and interest from the company behind De Krook. As the building is not merely a library, it would not have been fully exempt from VAT. At the end of December 2019, De Krook reached an agreement with the BBI, whereby some parts benefited from a VAT exemption and others did not. This means that the final VAT debt would only amount to a quarter to a third of the original amount demanded.

== Gallery ==
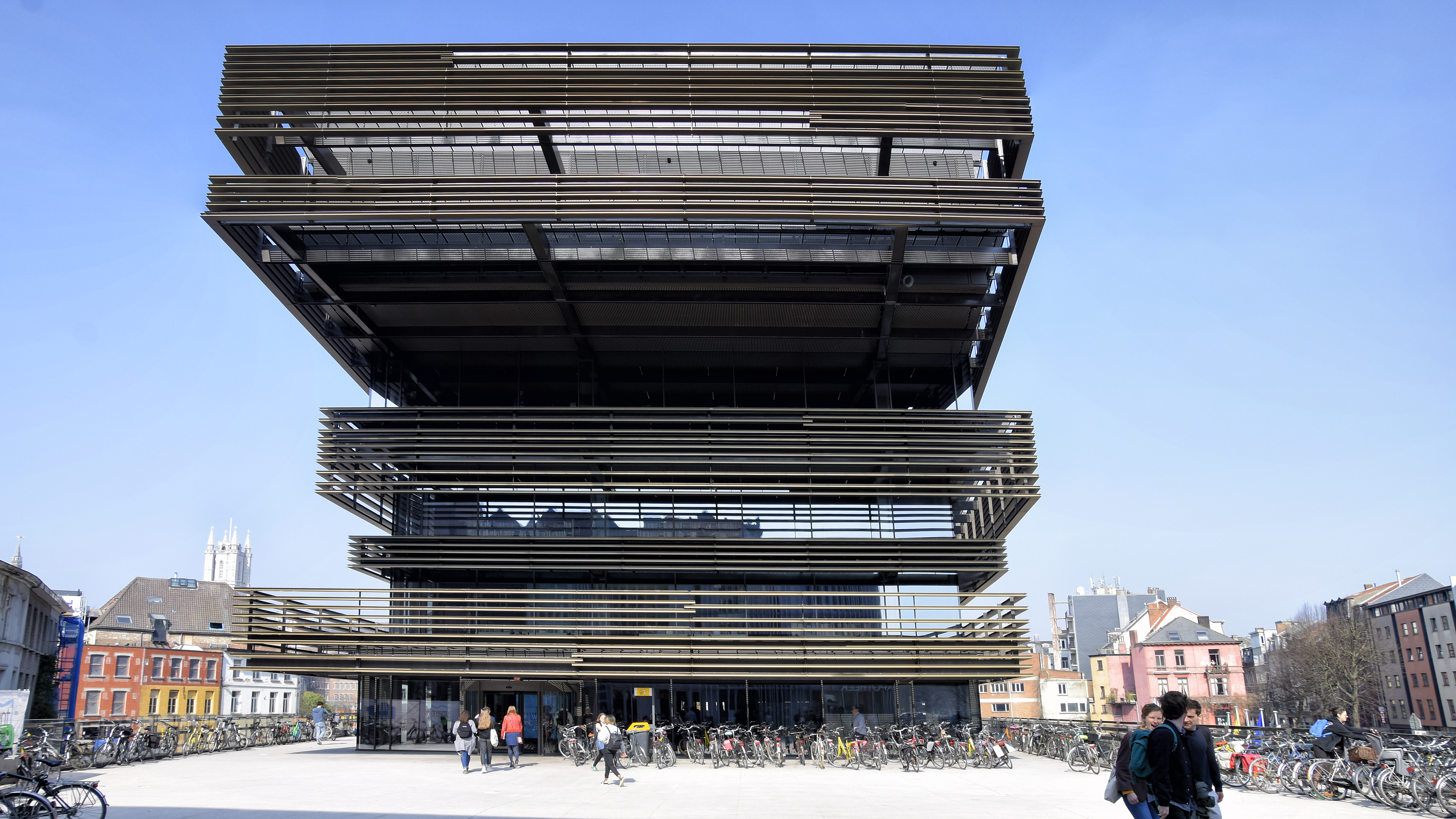
De Krook and the plaza at the entrance

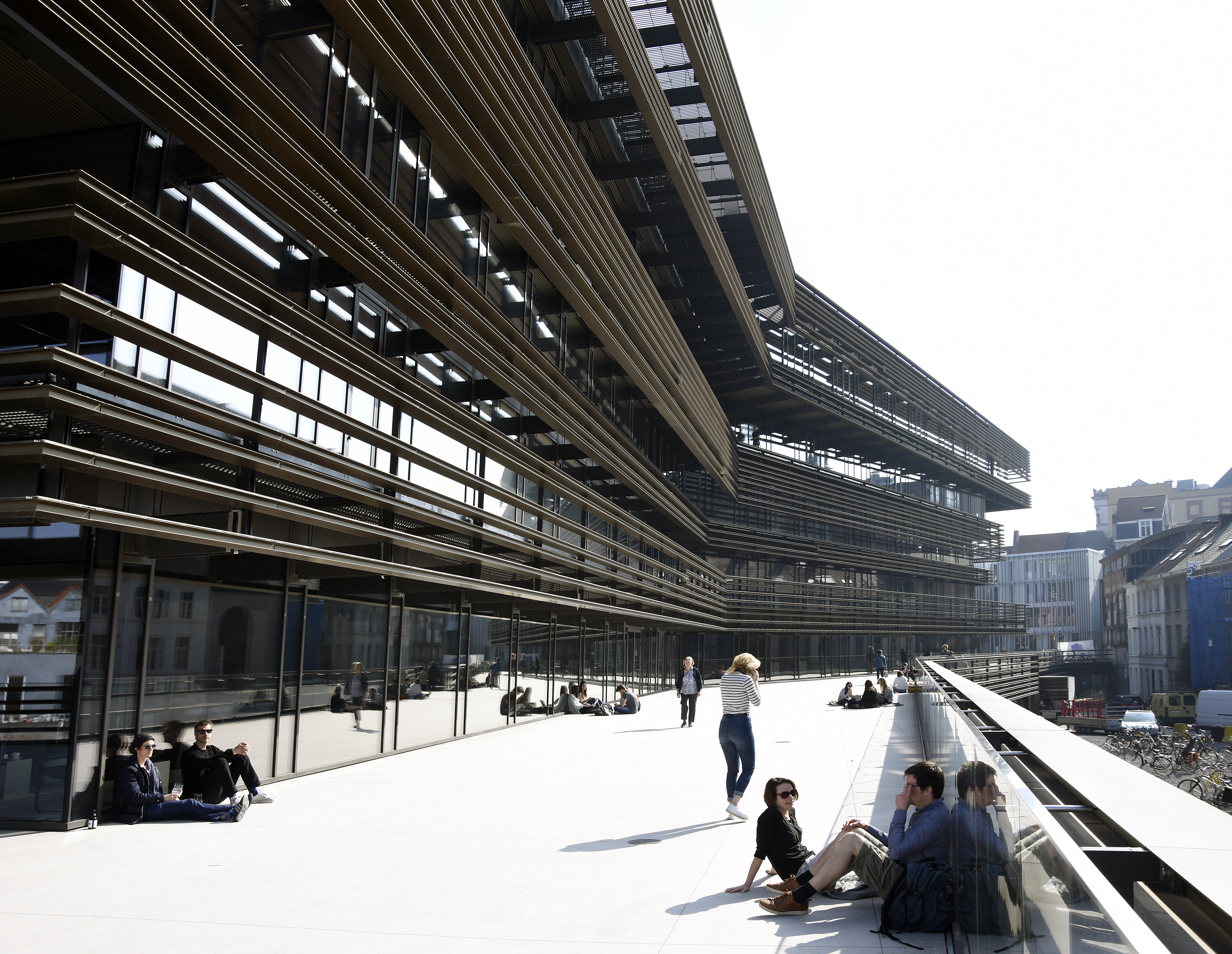
De Krook and the Miriam Makebaplein

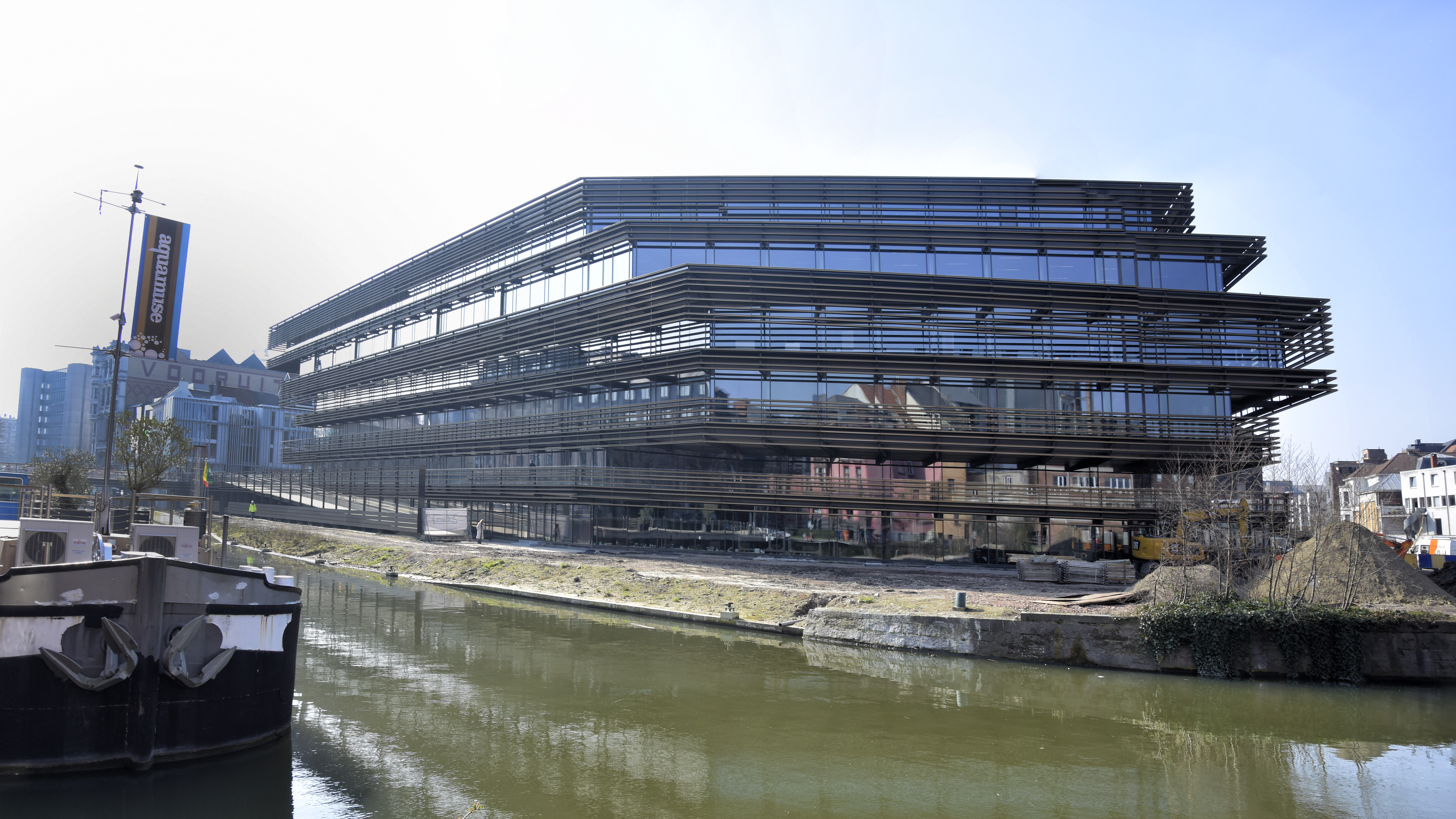
De Krook from the Muinkschelde

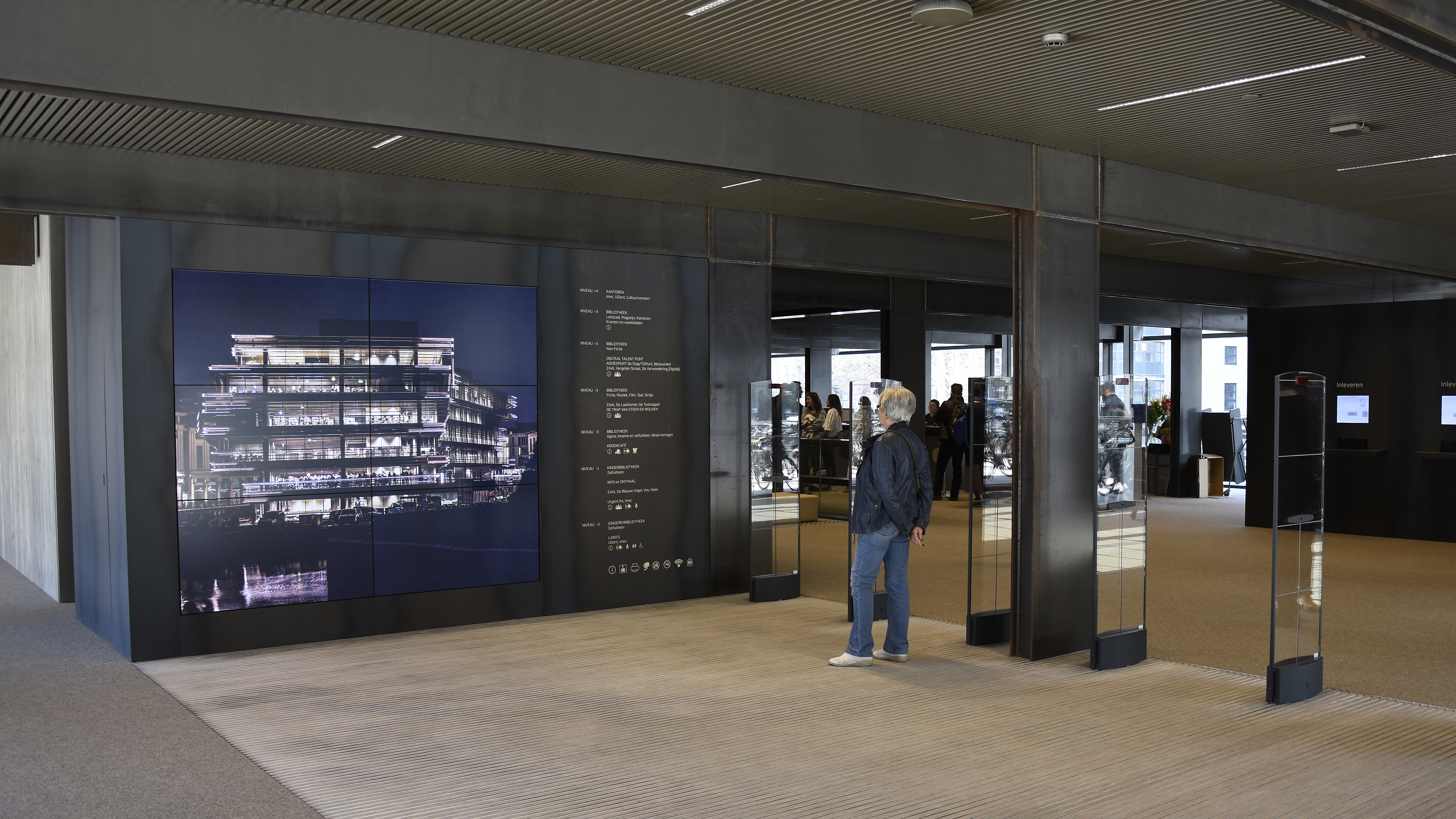
Entrance

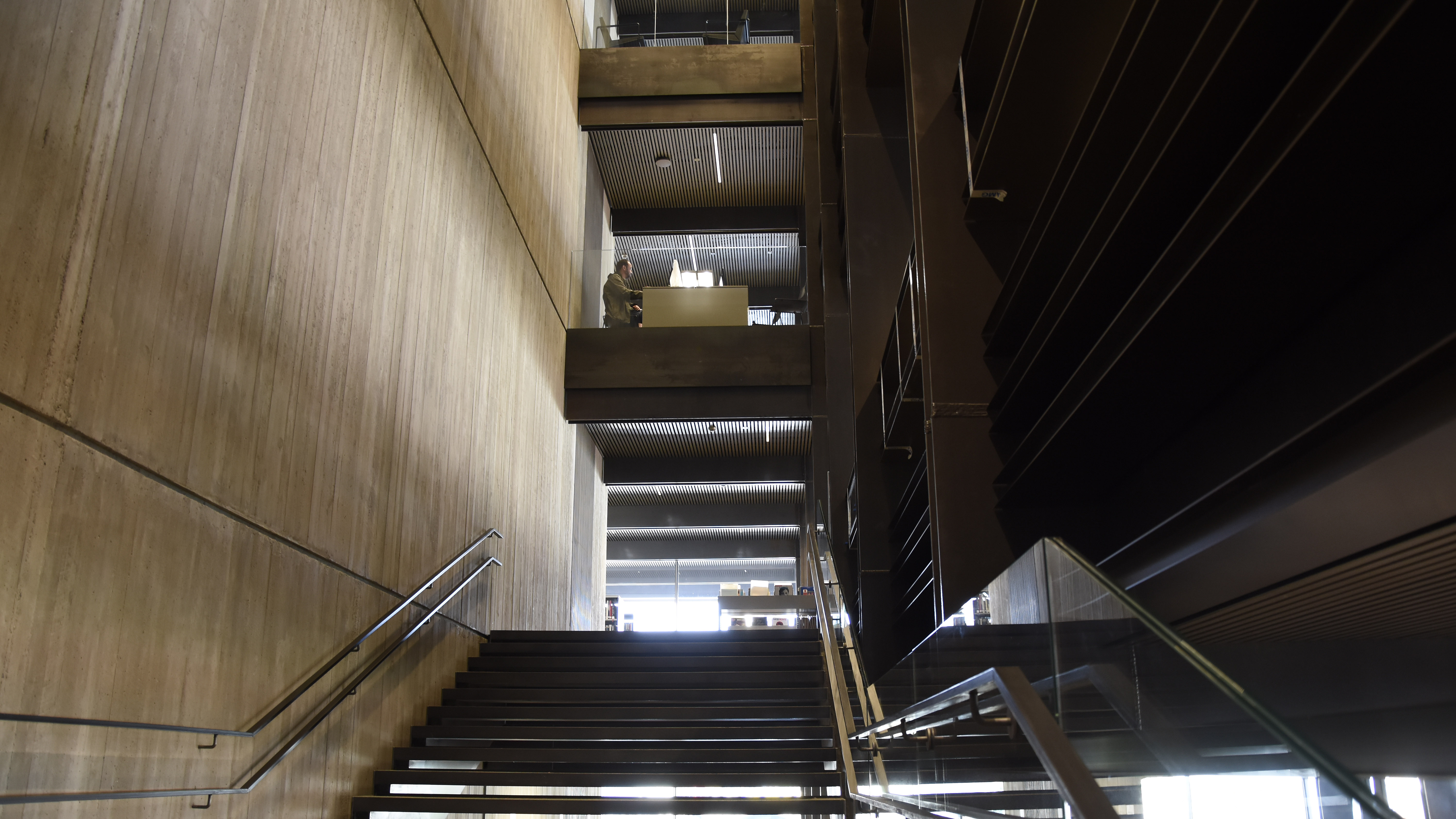
A staircase

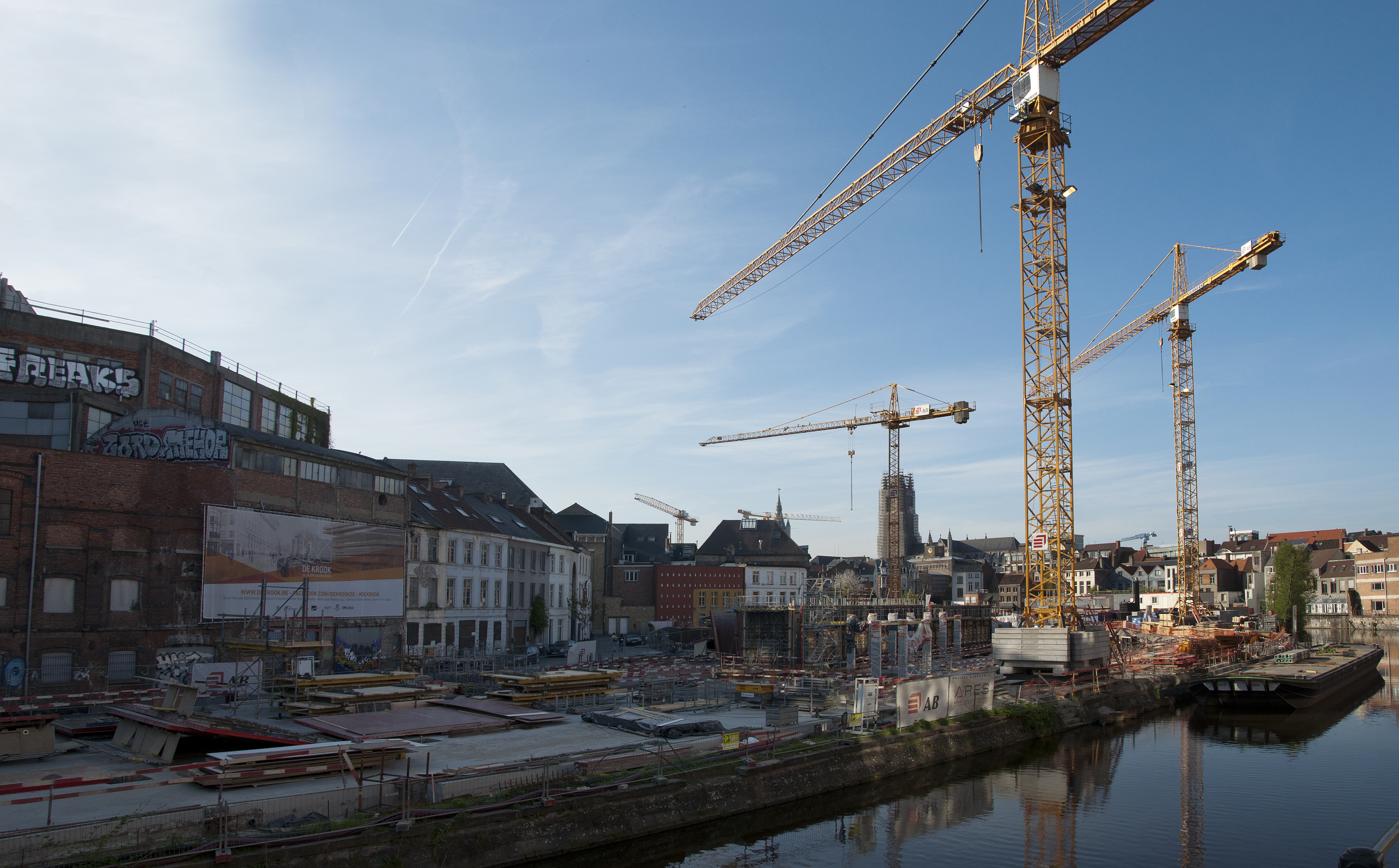
The construction site, April 2014

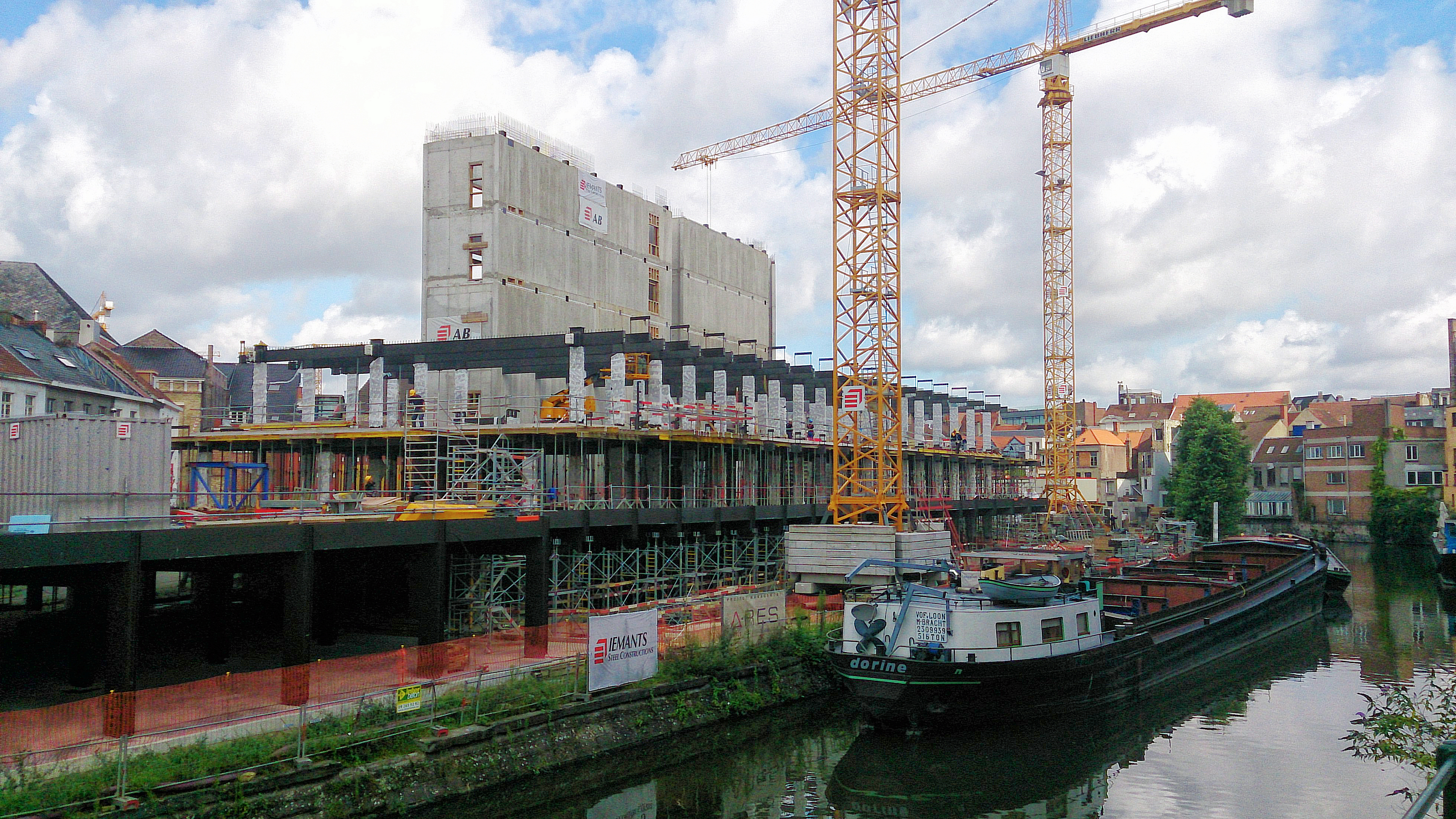
The construction site, August 2014
