= Fina Puigdevall =

Spanish chef and restaurateur (born 1963)

- Born: Fina Puigdevall i Nogareda; 30 May 1963 (age 63); Olot, Catalonia, Spain
- Culinary career
- Cooking style: Catalan cuisine; Kilometre-zero cuisine
- Current restaurant: Les Cols (Olot)
- Awards won: Two Michelin stars; Michelin Green Star; Premi Nacional de Gastronomia (2019)

Fina Puigdevall i Nogareda (born 30 May 1963) is a Spanish chef and restaurateur from Catalonia. She has been the owner and head chef since 1990 of Les Cols, a restaurant in Olot, in the comarca of Garrotxa (province of Girona), housed in the family farmhouse in which she was born.

Les Cols holds two Michelin stars, the first awarded in 2005 and the second in 2010, and was among the first twenty-one establishments in Spain to be distinguished with the Michelin Green Star for sustainability. Puigdevall received the Premi Nacional de Gastronomia in 2019 and was elected a member of the Acadèmia Catalana de Gastronomia i Nutrició in May 2025.

== Early life and training ==
Puigdevall was born in Olot in 1963 at Mas Les Cols, a farmhouse that had belonged to her maternal grandmother and that would later house the restaurant. Largely self-taught, she built on the cooking knowledge of her mother and on her own attachment to her land to develop a style rooted in Catalan tradition and above all in that of the Garrotxa, in seasonality and in simple local products.

She began a law degree in Girona without a settled vocation and, since university classes were held in the mornings, spent her afternoons at cookery lessons given by Helena Pagans at the city's Casa de la Cultura; she went on to train at the Escola Arnadí in Barcelona, where the cook Bernard Benbassat taught her classical French technique, and she was also influenced by the winter courses that Ferran Adrià ran at Cala Montjoi.

== Career ==
Puigdevall opened Les Cols in May 1990 with her husband Manel Puigvert, converting the ground floor of the family house into a restaurant; in 2003 the couple commissioned the Olot practice RCR Arquitectes to remodel the farmhouse, a project distinguished with a FAD prize, and between 2005 and 2006 the studio completed the work with five minimalist glass-and-steel pavilions inspired by the structure of vegetable gardens.

When the couple built the restaurant in the house where she had been born, she became one of the very few women working in a sector that at the time attracted little interest, and she has recalled that many people questioned their decision to open a restaurant at all; she has since described the transformation of the profession in Spain as spectacular.

The restaurant opened in the fifteenth-century family farmhouse with a wide-ranging menu intended to please every kind of customer. About ten years later Puigdevall and Puigvert reconsidered the project and decided that the cooking would be the cooking she wanted to do, a shift that led to the removal of sea fish and shellfish from the menu and to a strict reliance on the produce of the Garrotxa; according to Puigdevall the more radical the culinary discourse became, the more successful the restaurant was.

== Cuisine and philosophy ==
Puigdevall's cooking is built on what she calls "non-travelled food": she gave up cooking sea fish in order to work with the produce of her own district, and, together with the farmer Carme de la Rovira, recovered the cultivation of buckwheat (fajol) in the Garrotxa at a time when nobody trusted the project; the restaurant's kitchen garden is tended by a team that includes a biologist, an organic-agriculture specialist and a naturalist and geographer.

Ingredients that never disappear from her menus include buckwheat, turnip, the white beans of Santa Pau and truffle; another feature of her cooking is the search for the essence of each idea, stripping the dish back so as to say a great deal with very little, and, in a play on the name of the restaurant, there is always a preparation containing cabbage (col).

=== Kitchen garden and research ===
Around 2014 the restaurant began growing maize and buckwheat, two traditional crops of the district, in the fields surrounding Casa Horitzó, its research and development centre in the Vall de Bianya; a vegetable plot for organic produce, flowers and aromatic herbs was added in 2017, organic waste from the restaurant is composted to fertilise it, and a mobile henhouse supplies the eggs, with recovered local varieties including two types of wheat, white aubergine and the floreta pea grown with the support of the Garrotxa Volcanic Zone Natural Park.

== Personal life ==
Puigdevall is married to Manel Puigvert, and the couple have three daughters, Clara, Martina and Carlota Puigvert Puigdevall, who all work with her at the restaurant; the family keeps its own kitchen garden, which can be visited at the Casa Horitzó research centre, and the old farmhouse now has a strikingly contemporary interior in which the relationship between the dining spaces and nature is central, most visibly in the events pavilion, around which hens roam freely.

Her daughter Martina Puigvert Puigdevall, head chef at Les Cols, was recognised as Young Chef at the Michelin gala held in Barcelona on 28 November 2023 for the 2024 Spanish edition of the guide. She was twenty-nine at the time and was chosen for her demanding standards and for showing a personality of her own, and in 2024 she took her mother's style of cooking to the Veraz restaurant in Barcelona with a menu based on seasonal, non-travelled ingredients. That collaboration was extended while she continued to work daily in the kitchen at Les Cols.

== Awards and recognition ==
Puigdevall's first distinction was the Tallant d'Honor for Girona cuisine in 1994, which recognised her as the best chef in the province of Girona; she later received the Premi Ali Bei of the Catalan Association of Tourism Journalists and Writers in 2015, the Premi Woman a la Gastronomia and the sustainability award of the publisher Montagud Editores, was included in Forbes's list of the hundred most influential women in Spain in 2023, and in November 2025 was given the Ricard Simon Business Excellence Award by Olot City Council in recognition of her culinary excellence and her commitment to her territory.

In 2020 the Guía Repsol raised Les Cols to three Soles, its highest rating. The Michelin Green Star held by the restaurant is a distinction created by the guide and awarded for the first time in Spain and Portugal in its 2021 selection.

Together with her daughter Martina Puigvert she was ranked ninety-first in The Best Chef Awards in 2023.
