= RCR Arquitectes =

Spanish architecture firm

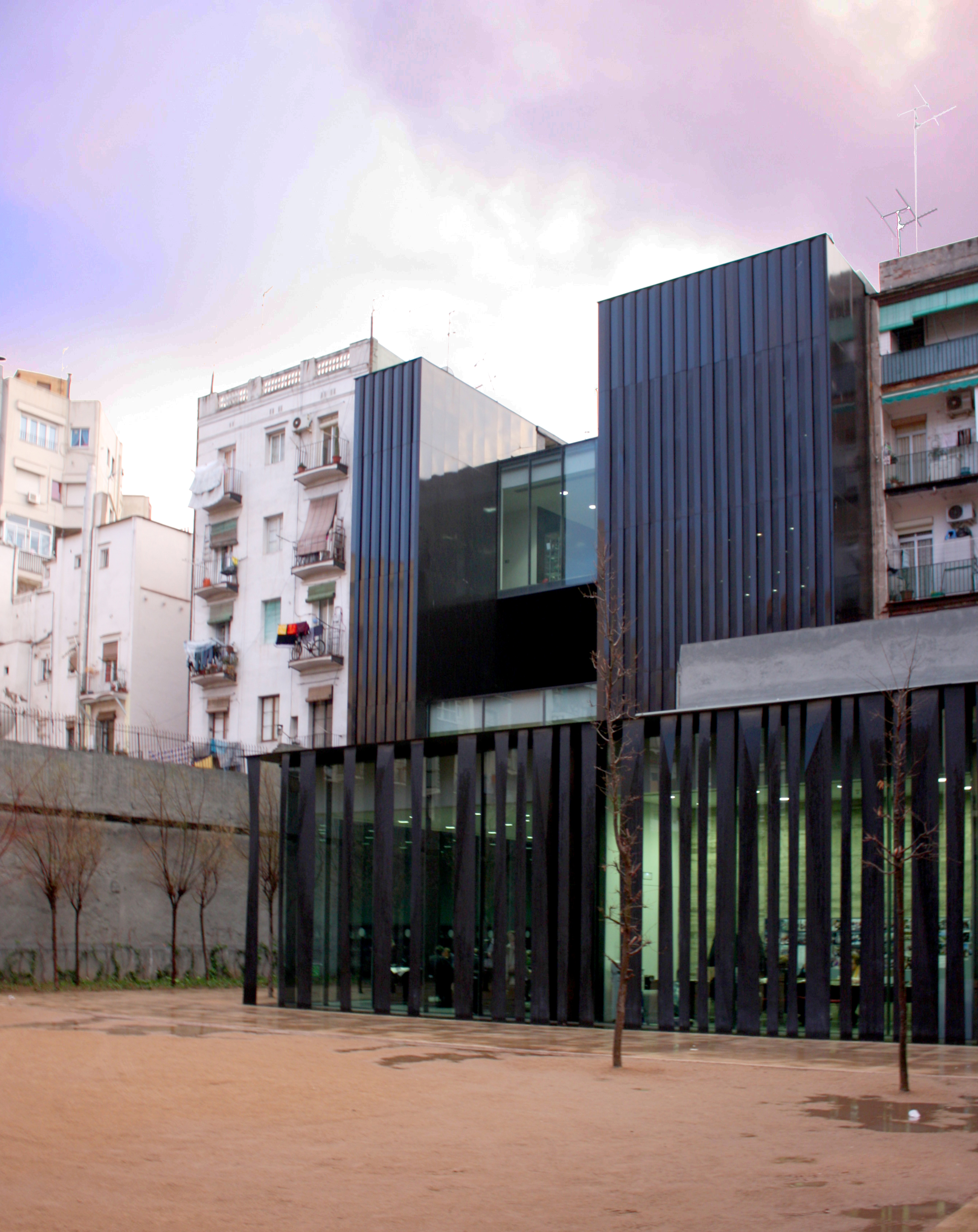
- Public Library in Barcelona, designed by RCR
- Founded: 1988
- Founders: Rafael Aranda, Carme Pigem, Ramon Vilalta
- Headquarters: Olot, Catalonia, Spain
- Key people: Rafael Aranda, Carme Pigem, Ramon Vilalta
- Website: www.rcrarquitectes.es

RCR Arquitectes is a Spanish architecture firm consisting of principals and co-founders Rafael Aranda, Carme Pigem and Ramon Vilalta. The trio were the 2017 recipients of the Pritzker Prize for Architecture. While the firm had won many awards before the Pritzker, they were relatively unknown compared to other finalists.

== History ==
The firm was founded in Olot, Spain in 1988.

== Style ==
The firm is known for its frequent use of weathering steel in its projects.

== Selected projects ==
The firm designed the imposing Musée Soulages in Rodez, France, after winning a 2007 competition.

- De Krook, the central public library and media center in Ghent, Belgium, designed in collaboration with local firm Coussée & Goris and opened in 2017.
- Celler Peralada, the first winery in Europe to receive the golden LEED certificate for Leadership in Energy and Environmental Design.
- Muraba Veil, residential project, Dubai
- Les Cols restaurant in Olot, the firm's home town, a refurbishment of an old walled farmhouse carried out in 2001–2002 for the chef Fina Puigdevall.
