= Gregory Phillips Architects =

British architecture firm

Gregory Phillips
- Industry: Architecture & Design
- Founded: 1991
- Headquarters: London
- Key people: Gregory Phillips
- Services: Residential Architecture & Interior Design
- Number of employees: 9
- Website: gregoryphillips.com

Gregory Phillips Architects is a London based architecture and interior design firm.

== Background ==
The company was founded by Gregory Phillips in 1991 and based in London's Mayfair on Savile Row, Gregory Phillips Architects is a RIBA Chartered Practice. Phillips, is a member of the British Institute of Interior Design.

== Projects ==
Refurbishment and remodeling

- Chelsea Harbour Apartment, Completed 2014
- Hertfordshire Listed Building, Completed 2013
- Carlton Hill, St Johns Wood, London Completed 2013
- Hyde Park Mews Completed 2012
- Totteridge Residence, Completed 2009
- Highbury Hill, Completed 2010

New build

- Berkshire, Detached Private Dwellings, completed 2011 and 2017
- Salisbury, Detached Private Dwelling, completed 2011
- Roehampton, Detached Private Dwelling, completed 2010
- Hyde Park, Mews House Private Dwelling, completed 2012
- Richmond, Detached Private Dwelling, completed 2007

Extension

- Wimbledon, Private Dwelling, Completed 2010
- Guildford, Private Dwelling, Completed 2009
- Kew, Private Dwelling, Completed 2011
- Sheen, Private Dwelling, Completed 2008
- Shoreditch, Apartments, Completed 2008
- Ware, Private Dwelling, Completed 2014

Interior design

- Berkshire Completed 2011
- Belsize Park, Apartment Remodeling, Conservation and refurbishment, Completed 2011
- Muswell Hill, Completed 2013

== Awards and recognition ==
- RIBA Regional Award 2018 South Award Winner – Berkshire House
- RIBA Regional Award 2012 South/Southeast Downland Award Winner – Berkshire Residence
- International Design and Architecture Award Winner 2012 – Best Residential Property in Europe – Berkshire Residence
- Sunday Times British Homes Award 2012 Winner – Bespoke Luxury Living – Berkshire Residence
- Sunday Times British Home Award 2012 Architect of the Year – Finalist
- RIBA Award 2010 Residential Category Finalist – Wimbledon Residence
- Grand Designs 2010 Best Extension Finalist – Guildford Residence
- Grand Designs 2010 Best Conversion Finalist – Shoreditch Penthouse
- Grand Designs 2009 Best Extension Finalist – Muswell Hill Residence
- Daily Telegraph H&R 2008 Best Extension/Remodel Winner – Muswell Hill Residence

Interior design awards

- Best Bathroom Designer of 2013 Homes & Garden Award 2013
- Sunday Times British Homes Award 2012 Association with the British Institute of Interior Design – Interior Design Winner – Berkshire
- International Property Award for Interior Design, Private House, South-East– Winner -Berkshire
- British Homes Award 2009 Best Interior Design UK Totteridge Residence
- Bentley International Property Awards 2005 Best Interior Design – 5 Star Winner- ‘World's Best’

== Press and book coverage ==
- Britain's Best Architecture, Author: Gary Takle, Paperback ISBN 098713566X
- London Evening Standard Homes & Property 16 July 2014
- Living Etc. April 2014
- AJ Architects Journal 12 September 2012
- Architecture Foundation, New Architects 2
- Conde Design
