= Formoso do Araguaia =

Municipality in Tocantins, Brazil

- Municipality
- The Municipality of Formoso do Araguaia
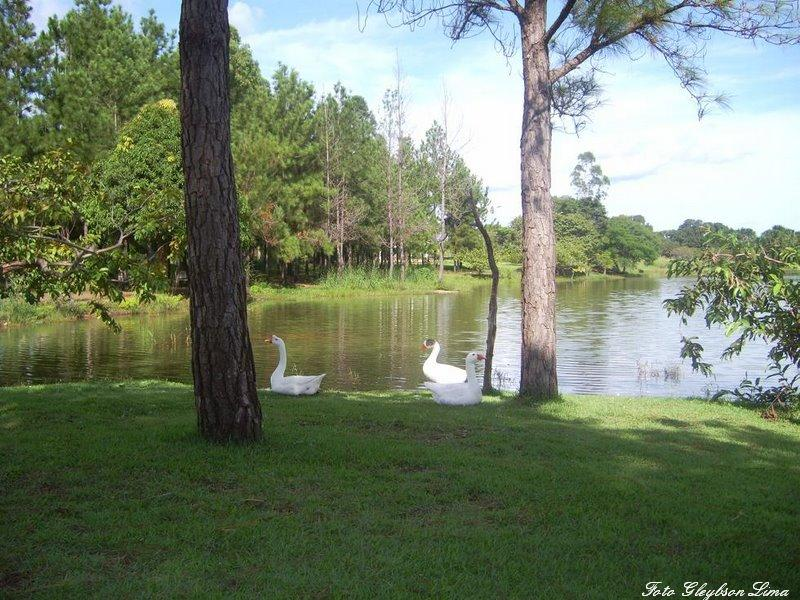
- A lake in Formoso do Araguaia

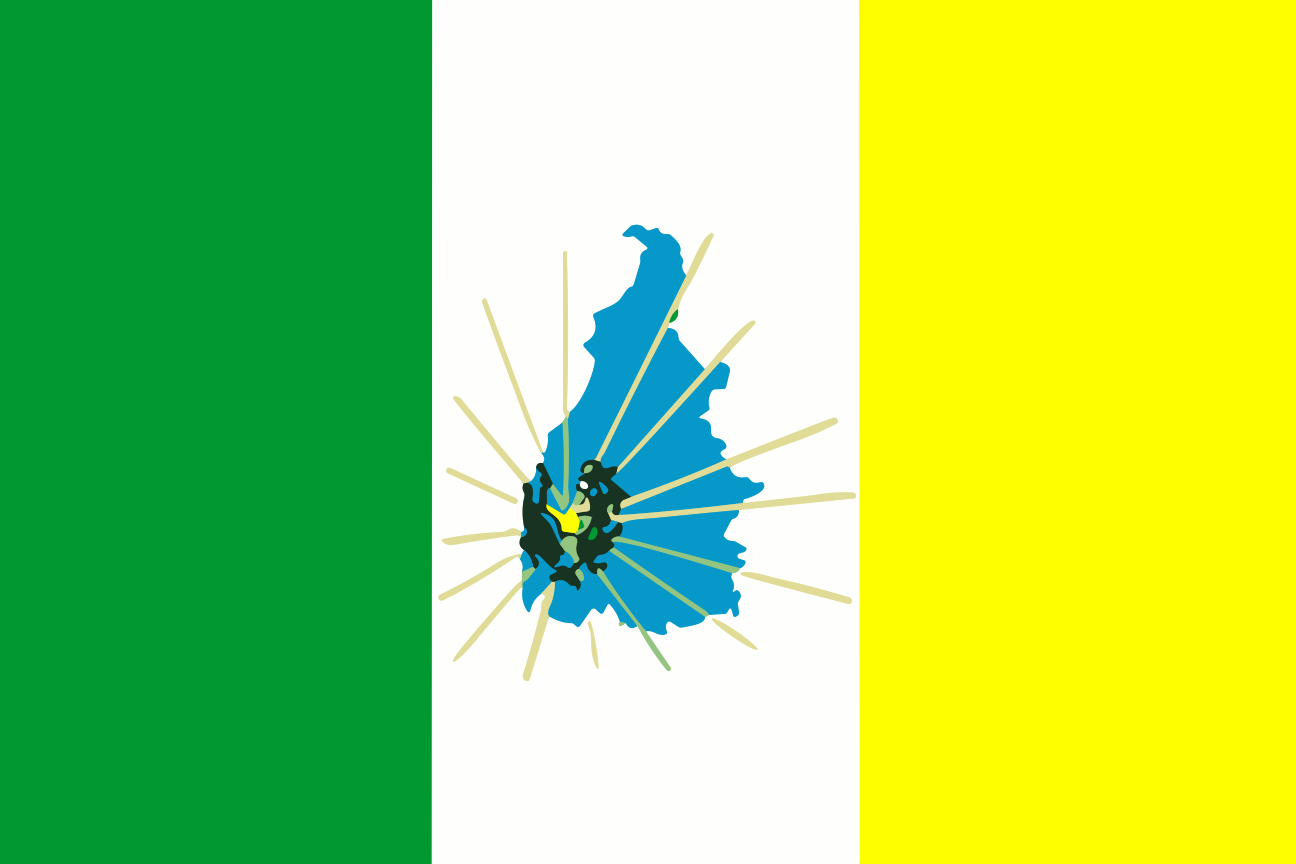
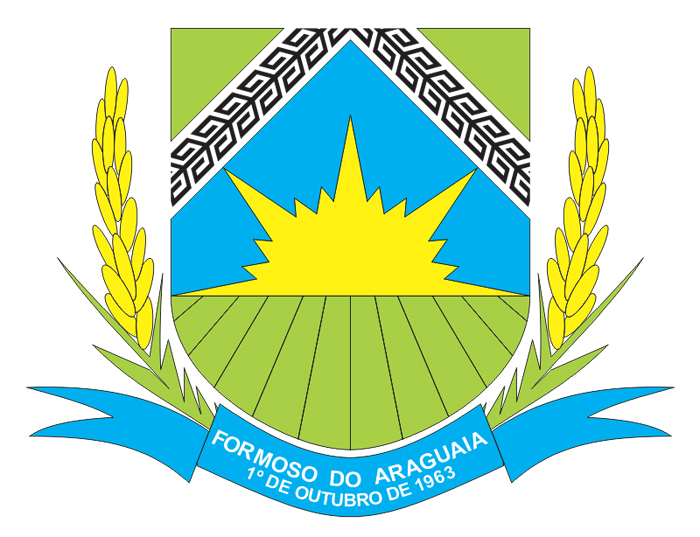
- Flag Coat of arms

- Location of Formoso do Araguaia in the state of Tocantins

- Location of Formoso do Araguaia in Brazil
- Coordinates: 11°48′09″S 49°31′42″W
- Country: Brazil
- Region: North
- State: Tocantins
- Founded: October 1, 1963

Government
  - Mayor: Pedro Rezende (PTB)

Area
  - Total: 13,423.256 km^{2} (5,182.748 sq mi)
- Elevation: 240 m (790 ft)

Population (2020)
  - Total: 18,399
  - Density: 1.3707/km^{2} (3.5500/sq mi)
- Time zone: UTC−3 (BRT)
- HDI (2000): 0.710 – medium

Formoso do Araguaia is a municipality in the state of Tocantins in the Northern region of Brazil. It is the largest municipality by area in that state.

== See also ==
- List of municipalities in Tocantins
