= Shelley McNamara =

Irish architect

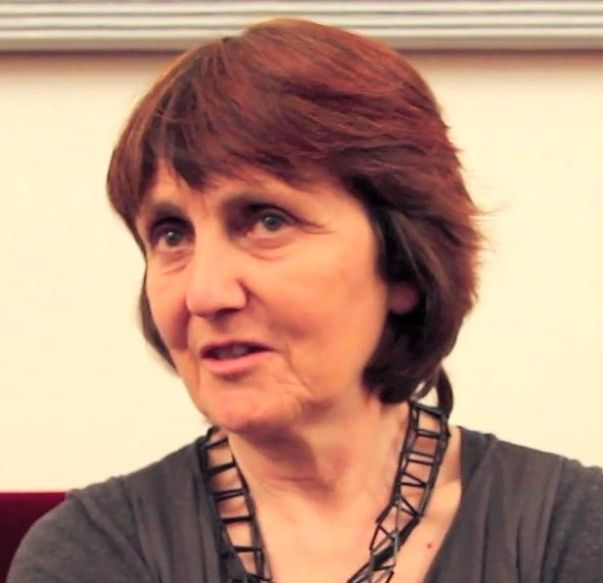
- McNamara in 2013
- Born: 1952 (age 73–74); Lisdoonvarna, Ireland
- Education: University College Dublin
- Occupation: Architect
- Awards: Pritzker Prize; Royal Gold Medal others
- Practice: Grafton Architects
- Buildings: University of Engineering and Technology (Peru); Bocconi University buildings

Shelley McNamara (born 1952) is an Irish architect and academic. She attended University College Dublin and graduated in 1974 with a Bachelor of Architecture. She founded Grafton Architects with Yvonne Farrell in 1978. Grafton rose to prominence in the early 2010s, specialising in stark, weighty but spacious buildings for higher education. McNamara has taught architecture at University College Dublin since 1976 and at several other universities.

The Grafton practice was awarded the 2020 Royal Institute of British Architects Royal Gold Medal and their building for the Universidad de Ingeniería y Tecnología in Lima, Peru, was awarded the 2016 RIBA International Prize, as the best new building in the world that year. In 2021, the practice was awarded the RIBA Stirling Prize for the Town House building of Kingston University. McNamara and Farrell shared the 2020 Pritzker Prize, architecture's highest award.

== Career ==
=== Grafton Architects ===
Together with Yvonne Farrell, McNamara established Grafton Architects in Dublin in 1978, naming it after Grafton Street in the city. As of 2017, the practice employed 25 people, with McNamara and Farrell leading the designs. They use weighty materials, including stone and concrete, to form spacious buildings which encourage interactions between people. McNamara described her approach to architecture as "rather than thinking of a space and then finding a structure for it, we make a structure and that, in turn, makes a space" and "the enjoyment in architecture is the sense of weight being borne down or supported".

The Röntgen Building by Grafton architects at Bocconi University in Milan

The pair have specialised in buildings for higher education, having designed buildings for universities in Toulouse, Limerick, London and others. These include teaching buildings, medical schools, and student accommodation. They drew international attention with a building for Bocconi University in Milan, which was completed in 2008. Their most celebrated building was for the Universidad de Ingeniería y Tecnología in Peru, which won the RIBA International Prize in 2016, as the best new building in the world that year.

The practice has also produced dozens of buildings in Ireland, for residential and commercial purposes as well as higher education.

=== Academia ===
McNamara has worked as a studio lecturer at the School of Architecture in UCD since 1976. Shortly after graduating from University College, Dublin, McNamara began teaching at the school along with Yvonne Farrell, where she taught consistently between 1976 and 2002. In 2015, McNamara became an adjunct professor at UCD.

In addition to UCD, McNamara has been a visiting professor at Oxford Brookes University, Accademia di Architettura di Mendrisio (2008– 2010), Oslo, and the École Polytechnique Fédérale de Lausanne (2010–2011). She became a full professor at Mendrisio in 2013. In 2010, McNamara held the Kenzo Tange Chair at Harvard Graduate School of Design and the Louis Kahn Chair at Yale University in Fall 2011. She served as an external examiner at Cambridge University and The London Metropolitan School of Architecture. In addition to teaching, McNamara has lectured widely in European and American Schools of Architecture.

=== Publications ===
McNamara, together with Yvonne Farrell, published the book Dialogue and Translation: Grafton Architects in 2014. This book comprises the firm's work, architectural musings and a collection of lectures delivered at Columbia University's Graduate School of Architecture, Planning, and Preservation. It includes a critical commentary from Kenneth Frampton.

== Personal life ==
McNamara's older brother is the property developer, Bernard McNamara.

== Major works ==
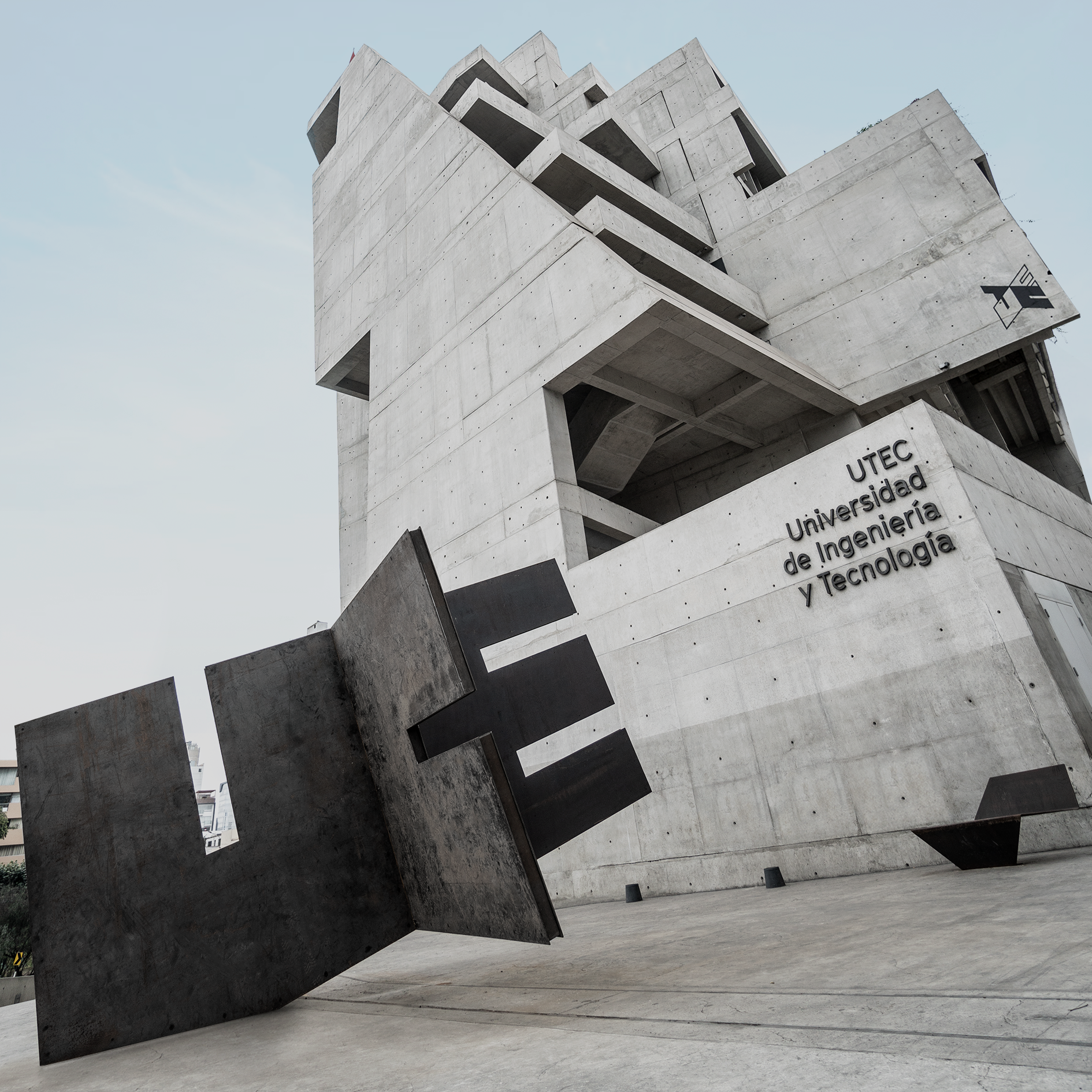
Campus UTEC Lima, Peru (2015)

- 2006: Solstice Arts Centre, Navan, Co.Meath, Ireland.
- 2008: Waterloo Lane Mews, Dublin 4, Ireland.
- 2008: Drogheda Fire and Rescue Services Station, Drogheda, Ireland
- 2012: University of Limerick Medical School, Limerick, Ireland.
- 2014: Memory / Grafton Architects, with the collaboration of ELISAVA for 300 Years of Catalan Spirit, Spain.
- In progress: London School of Economics and Political Science (LSE) shortlist for the new Global Centre for Social Sciences (GCSS) in London's Aldwych.
- 2015: University Campus UTEC Lima, Peru
- 2016: Competition Winner for The Paul Marshall Building - London School of Economics 44 Lincoln's Inn Fields, London, United Kingdom
- 2018: Curators of 2018 Venice Architecture Biennale FREESPACE / Grafton Architects, Italy.
- 2019: Université Toulouse 1 Capitole Toulouse, France
- 2020: Kingston University Town House
- 2021: ESB Headquarters, Fitzwilliam Street, Dublin 2

== Awards and exhibitions ==
- World Building of the Year Award, 2008 to Grafton Architects for the Bocconi University building in Milan, Italy.
- "Architecture as New Geography", Silver Lion Award at the Venice Biennale Common Ground Exhibition, 2012.
- University of Limerick Medical School and Pergola Bus Shelter, Shortlisted for the RIBA Stirling Prize, 2013.
- "University of Limerick Campus" exhibited in the Sensing Spaces show at the Royal Academy.
- Shortlisted for the 2014 AJ Women in Architecture Awards, 2014.
- Grafton Architects won the fourth annual Jane Drew Prize, 2015, for their "massive influence" on the profession.
- RIBA International Prize, 2016, for the Universidad de Ingeniería y Tecnología, Lima, Peru.
- Appointed as curator of the 16th Venice Biennale of Architecture in 2018.
- Honorary doctorate from Trinity College Dublin, 2019.
- Pritzker Architecture Prize winner in 2020, shared with Farrell.
- The Daylight Award 2022, Daylight in architecture laurate, shared with Yvonne Farrell
- UCD Alumni Award for Architecture 2015

McNamara is a fellow of the Royal Institute of the Architects of Ireland and an Honorary Fellow of the Royal Institute of British Architects. She was the first architect to be elected a member of Aosdána, an association of Irish artists.
