= Yvonne Farrell =

Irish architect (born 1951)

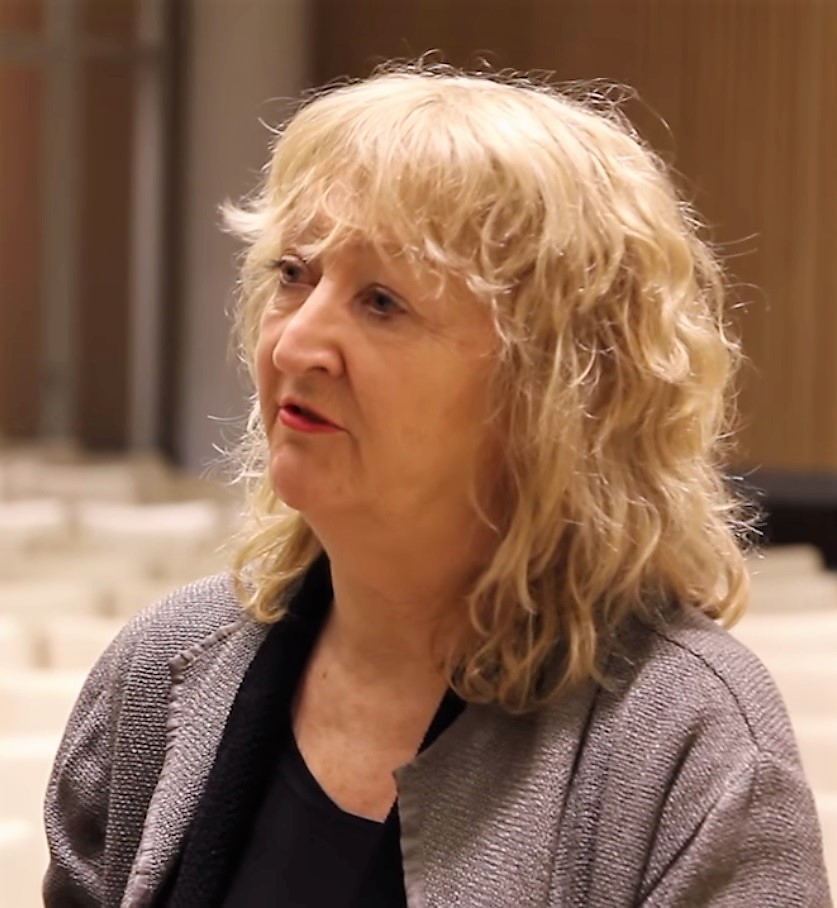
- Farrell in 2015
- Born: 1951 (age 74–75); Tullamore, County Offaly
- Education: University College Dublin
- Occupation: Architect
- Notable work: The Röntgen Building
- Awards: Pritzker Architecture Prize (with Shelley McNamara)

Yvonne Farrell (born 1951) is an Irish architect and academic. She is the co-founder, together with Shelley McNamara, of Grafton Architects, which won the World Building of the Year award in 2008 for their Bocconi University building in Milan. The practice won the inaugural RIBA International Prize in 2016 for their Universidad de Ingeniería y Tecnología building in Lima, Peru, and was awarded the 2020 Royal Gold Medal. In 2017 she was appointed, along with Shelley McNamara, as curator of the 16th Venice Biennale of Architecture in 2018. She won the Pritzker Architecture Prize in 2020, also with McNamara.

== Career ==
Farrell studied architecture at University College Dublin, graduating in 1974 with a bachelor's degree. In 1977, together with Shelley McNamara, she established Grafton Architects in Dublin. She is a founder member of Group 91, which was behind the revitalization of the Temple Bar district of Dublin in the 1990s.

Grafton Architects represented Ireland at the Venice Biennale in 2002 and exhibited there again in 2008. Their Bocconi University project in Milan, which won the World Building of the Year Award in 2008, has been widely acclaimed and exhibited. In 2009, the Department of Finance building in Dublin's city centre won the Civic Trust Award as well as the Architectural Association of Ireland Special Award.

Farrell has taught at University College Dublin since 1976 and has been a visiting professor at the Architecture Academy in Mendrisio, Switzerland, since 2008. She held the Kenzo Tange chair at the Harvard Graduate School of Design in 2010 and currently teaches at the EPFL in Lausanne. She has lectured widely in European and American schools of architecture, including Oslo, Stockholm, Berlage, Yale, Buffalo, St.Louis, Kansas City and Tampa.

Farrell is a fellow of the Royal Institute of the Architects of Ireland, an Honorary Fellow of the Royal Institute of British Architects and an elected member of Aosdána, the Irish arts organisation. Furthermore, she is an adjunct professor at University College Dublin. In 2015, she was awarded the UCD Alumni Award for Architecture. In November 2019, Farrell and her partner at Grafton Architects, Shelley McNamara, were awarded an honorary degree by NUI Galway, and in April 2019 they were awarded an honorary doctorate by Trinity College Dublin. She and McNamara won the Pritzker Architecture Prize in 2020, making them the fourth and fifth women ever to be awarded the prize. In 2022 Yvonne Farrell and Shelley McNamara were awarded The Daylight Award for daylight in architecture.

== Main projects ==
- Grafton Building (Universita Luigi Bocconi), 2008, Milan, Italy
- Department of Finance, 2009, Dublin, Ireland
- Institut Mines Telecom, 2019, Paris Saclay, France
- Toulouse School of economics, 2019, Toulouse, France
