= Pritzker Architecture Prize =

International architecture award

- Current: Smiljan Radić Clarke
- Medal of the Pritzker Architecture Prize
- Awarded for: A career of achievement in the art of architecture
- Sponsored by: Hyatt Foundation
- Reward: US$100,000
- First award: 1979; 47 years ago
- Website: www.pritzkerprize.com

The Pritzker Architecture Prize is an international award presented annually "to honor a living architect or architects whose built work demonstrates a combination of those qualities of talent, vision and commitment which has produced consistent and significant contributions to humanity and the built environment through the art of architecture". Founded in 1979 by Jay A. Pritzker and his wife Cindy, the award is funded by the Pritzker family and sponsored by the Hyatt Foundation. It is considered to be one of the world's premier architecture prizes, and is often referred to as the Nobel Prize of architecture.

== Criteria and proceedings ==
The Pritzker Architecture Prize Jury says it is awarded "irrespective of nationality, race, creed, or ideology". The recipients receive US$100,000, a citation certificate, and, since 1987, a bronze medallion. The designs on the medal are inspired by the work of architect Louis Sullivan, while the Latin inspired inscription on the reverse of the medallion—firmitas, utilitas, venustas (English: firmness, commodity and delight)—is from Ancient Roman architect Vitruvius. Before 1987, a limited edition Henry Moore sculpture accompanied the monetary prize.

The executive director of the prize, Manuela Lucá-Dazio, solicits nominations from a range of people, including past Laureates, academics, critics and others "with expertise and interest in the field of architecture". Any licensed architect can also make a personal application for the prize before November 1 every year. (In 1988 Gordon Bunshaft nominated himself for the award and eventually won it.) The jury, consisting of five to nine "experts ... recognized professionals in their own fields of architecture, business, education, publishing, and culture", deliberates and early in the following year announce the winner. The prize chair is the 2016 Pritzker laureate Alejandro Aravena; earlier chairs were J. Carter Brown (1979–2002), the Lord Rothschild (2003–2004), the Lord Palumbo (2005–2015), Glenn Murcutt (2016–2018) and Stephen Breyer (2019–2020).

== Laureates ==
Inaugural winner Philip Johnson was cited "for 50 years of imagination and vitality embodied in a myriad of museums, theaters, libraries, houses, gardens and corporate structures". The 2004 laureate Zaha Hadid was the first female prize winner. Ryue Nishizawa became the youngest winner in 2010 at age 44. Partners in architecture (in 2001, Jacques Herzog and Pierre de Meuron, in 2010, Kazuyo Sejima and Ryue Nishizawa, in 2020, Yvonne Farrell and Shelley McNamara, and in 2021, Anne Lacaton and Jean-Philippe Vassal) have shared the award. In 1988, Gordon Bunshaft and Oscar Niemeyer were both separately honored with the award. The 2017 winners, architects Rafael Aranda, Carme Pigem, and Ramón Vilalta were the first group of three to share the prize.

Pritzker Architecture Prize winners
Year	Laureate(s)	Nationality	Photo	Example work (year completed)	Award ceremony location	Ref.
1979	Philip Johnson	United States		Glass House (1949)	Dumbarton Oaks, Washington DC	
1980	Luis Barragán	Mexico		Cuadra San Cristóbal (1968)	Dumbarton Oaks, Washington DC	
1981	James Stirling	United Kingdom		Seeley Historical Library (1968)	National Building Museum, Washington DC	
1982	Kevin Roche	Ireland; United States^{[a]}		Ford Foundation Building (1967)	Art Institute of Chicago	
1983	I. M. Pei	United States^{[b]}		National Gallery of Art, East Building (1978)	Metropolitan Museum of Art, New York City	
1984	Richard Meier	United States		High Museum of Art (1983)	National Gallery of Art, Washington DC	
1985	Hans Hollein	Austria		Abteiberg Museum (1982)	The Huntington Library, San Marino, California	
1986	Gottfried Böhm	Germany (West Germany)		Church of the Pilgrimage (1968)	Worshipful Company of Goldsmiths, London	
1987	Kenzō Tange	Japan		St. Mary's Cathedral, Tokyo (1964)	Kimbell Art Museum, Fort Worth, Texas	
1988	Gordon Bunshaft (shared prize)	United States		Beinecke Rare Book and Manuscript Library (1963)	Art Institute of Chicago	
1988	Oscar Niemeyer (shared prize)	Brazil		Cathedral of Brasília (1958)	Art Institute of Chicago	
1989	Frank Gehry	Canada; United States^{[c]}		Gehry Residence (1978)	Tōdai-ji, Nara, Japan	
1990	Aldo Rossi	Italy		San Cataldo Cemetery (1978)	Palazzo Grassi, Venice	
1991	Robert Venturi	United States		National Gallery, Sainsbury Wing (1991)	Palace of Iturbide, Mexico City	
1992	Álvaro Siza Vieira	Portugal		Leça Swimming Pools (1966)	Harold Washington Library, Chicago	
1993	Fumihiko Maki	Japan		Tokyo Metropolitan Gymnasium (1991)	Prague Castle	
1994	Christian de Portzamparc	France		City of Music (1995)	The Commons, Columbus, Indiana	
1995	Tadao Ando	Japan		Church of the Light (1989)	Petit Trianon, Versailles	
1996	Rafael Moneo	Spain		National Museum of Roman Art (1986)	Getty Center, Los Angeles	
1997	Sverre Fehn	Norway		Norwegian Glacier Museum (1991)	Guggenheim Museum Bilbao	
1998	Renzo Piano	Italy		Kansai International Airport (1994)	White House, Washington DC	
1999	Norman Foster	United Kingdom		HSBC Building (1985)	Altes Museum, Berlin	
2000	Rem Koolhaas	Netherlands		Kunsthal (1992)	Jerusalem Archaeological Park	
2001	Jacques Herzog & Pierre de Meuron	Switzerland		Tate Modern (2000)	Monticello, Charlottesville, Virginia	
2002	Glenn Murcutt	Australia		Berowra Waters Inn (1983)	Campidoglio, Rome	
2003	Jørn Utzon	Denmark		Sydney Opera House (1973)	Royal Academy of Fine Arts of San Fernando, Madrid	
2004	Zaha Hadid	Iraq; United Kingdom^{[d]}		Bergisel Ski Jump (2003)	Hermitage Museum, Saint Petersburg	
2005	Thom Mayne	United States		Caltrans District 7 Headquarters (2004)	Pritzker Pavilion, Chicago	
2006	Paulo Mendes da Rocha	Brazil		Saint Peter Chapel, Campos do Jordão, São Paulo (1987)	Dolmabahçe Palace, Istanbul	
2007	Richard Rogers	Italy; United Kingdom^{[e]}		Lloyd's building (1986)	Banqueting House, Whitehall, London	
2008	Jean Nouvel	France		Torre Agbar (2005)	Library of Congress, Washington DC	
2009	Peter Zumthor	Switzerland		Therme Vals (1996)	Legislative Palace of the City Council, Buenos Aires	
2010	Kazuyo Sejima and Ryue Nishizawa	Japan		21st Century Museum of Contemporary Art, Kanazawa (2003)	Ellis Island, New York City	
2011	Eduardo Souto de Moura	Portugal		Estádio Municipal de Braga (2004)	Andrew W. Mellon Auditorium, Washington DC	
2012	Wang Shu	China		Ningbo Museum (2008)	Great Hall of the People, Beijing	
2013	Toyo Ito	Japan		Sendai Mediatheque (2001)	John F. Kennedy Presidential Library and Museum, Boston	
2014	Shigeru Ban	Japan		Centre Pompidou-Metz (2010)	Rijksmuseum, Amsterdam	
2015	Frei Otto^{[†]}	Germany		Olympic Stadium, Munich (1972)	New World Center, Miami	
2016	Alejandro Aravena	Chile		Siamese Towers, Pontifical Catholic University of Chile (2005)	United Nations Headquarters, New York City	
2017	Rafael Aranda, Carme Pigem, and Ramon Vilalta	Spain	–	Sant Antoni Library, Barcelona (2008)	Akasaka Palace, Tokyo	
2018	B. V. Doshi	India		Indian Institute of Management Bangalore (1977–1992, multiple phases)	Aga Khan Museum, Toronto	
2019	Arata Isozaki	Japan		Art Tower Mito (1990)	Palace of Versailles	
2020^{[g]}	Yvonne Farrell and Shelley McNamara	Ireland		The Grafton Building of Bocconi University (2007)	Online	
2021^{[g]}	Anne Lacaton and Jean-Philippe Vassal	France		National School of Architecture, Nantes (2009)	Online	
2022	Diébédo Francis Kéré	Burkina Faso; Germany^{[h]}		Centre for Earth Architecture, Mopti, Mali (2010)	London School of Economics and Political Science (LSE) Marshall Building, London	
2023	David Chipperfield	United Kingdom		Neues Museum, Berlin (1997–2009)	Ancient Agora of Athens	
2024	Riken Yamamoto	Japan^{[i]}		Yokosuka Museum of Art, Kanagawa, Japan (2007)	Art Institute of Chicago	
2025	Liu Jiakun	China		West Village, Chengdu, China (2015)	Louvre Abu Dhabi	
2026	Smiljan Radić Clarke	Chile		Serpentine Gallery Pavilion, London (2014)		

=== Table notes ===
A. ^{a} Roche was born in Ireland.
B. ^{b} Pei was born in China.
C. ^{c} Gehry was born in Canada.
D. ^{d} Hadid was born in Iraq.
E. ^{e} Rogers was born in Italy into an Anglo-Italian family.
F. ^{†} Posthumous award.
G. ^{g} Ceremony held online due to the COVID-19 pandemic.
H. ^{h} Kéré was born in Burkina Faso.
I. ^{i} Yamamoto was born in China to Japanese parents while it was under Japanese occupation.

== Criticism ==
In 2013, the student organization "Women in Design" at the Harvard Graduate School of Design started a petition arguing Denise Scott Brown should receive joint recognition with her partner, Robert Venturi, who won the award in 1991. The petition, according to The New York Times, "reignited long-simmering tensions in the architectural world over whether women have been consistently denied the standing they deserve in a field whose most prestigious award was not given to a woman until 2004, when Zaha Hadid won". Scott Brown told CNN that "as a woman, she had felt excluded by the elite of architecture throughout her career," and that "the Pritzker Prize was based on the fallacy that great architecture was the work of a 'single lone male genius' at the expense of collaborative work." Responding to the petition, the 2013 prize jury said that it cannot revisit the decisions of past juries, either in the case of Scott Brown or that of Lu Wenyu, whose husband Wang Shu won in 2012. The 2020 Pritzker jury said in its citation awarding the prize to Yvonne Farrell and Shelley McNamara – making them the fourth and fifth women to ever be awarded the prize – that they were, "pioneers in a field that has traditionally been and still is a male-dominated profession [and] beacons to others as they forge their exemplary professional path."

In 2026, weeks before the year's Laureate was announced, Thomas Pritzker, the director of the Hyatt foundation and son of Jay A. Pritzker resigned from his role as the Hyatt Hotels Corporation executive chairman following the release of the Epstein files which contained communications between himself and Jeffrey Epstein, saying he "exercised terrible judgment in maintaining contact with" Epstein. However, Pritzker remains the director and vice president of the Hyatt foundation, and a Hyatt Hotels Corporation executive.

== See also ==
- Driehaus Architecture Prize
- J. Irwin and Xenia S. Miller Prize
- List of architecture awards
- List of design awards
- List of prizes known as the Nobel of a field or the highest honors of a field
