= List of architecture firms =

The following is a list of architectural firms. It includes notable worldwide examples of architecture firms, companies, practices, partnerships, etc.

== 1–9 ==
- 360 Architecture, United States
- 3LHD, Croatia
- 3XN, Denmark
- 1100 Architect, United States, Germany
- 5468796 Architecture, Canada

== A ==
- A69 Architects, Czech Republic
- AART architects, Denmark
- Adler & Sullivan, United States
- Adrian Smith + Gordon Gill Architecture (AS+GG), United States
- Aedas, United Kingdom, United States, Hong Kong
- Allen Jack+Cottier, Australia
- Allison & Allison, United States
- Altius Architects, Canada
- Archigram, United Kingdom
- archimania, United States
- Architecture Brio, India
- Arkitektfirmaet C. F. Møller, Denmark
- Armet Davis Newlove Architects, United States
- Arquitectonica, United States
- Ash Sakula Architects, United Kingdom
- Ashton Raggatt McDougall, Australia
- Asymptote, United States
- Atelier 5, Switzerland
- Atelier Bow-Wow, Japan
- Auer+Weber+Assoziierte, Germany
- Ayers Saint Gross, United States

== B ==
- Ballinger, United States
- Barnett, Haynes & Barnett, United States
- Bates Smart, Australia
- Baumschlager-Eberle, Austria
- BBPR, Italy
- Behnisch Architekten, Germany
- Bennetts Associates, United Kingdom
- Benoy, United Kingdom
- Benson & Forsyth, United Kingdom
- Bjarke Ingels Group, Denmark
- Bohlin Cywinski Jackson, United States
- Boller Brothers, United States
- Booty Edwards & Partners, Malaysia
- Bora Architects, United States
- Bregman + Hamann Architects, Canada
- Brooks + Scarpa, United States
- Building Design Partnership, United Kingdom

== C ==
- C Concept Design, Netherlands
- Carrère and Hastings, United States
- Chabanne et partenaires, France
- Chapman and Oxley, Canada
- Jack Allen Charney, Associates, United States
- Claude and Starck, United States
- Claus en Kaan Architecten, Netherlands
- Cobe architects, Denmark
- Concertus Design and Property Consultants, England
- Consolidated Consultants CC, Jordan
- COOKFOX, United States
- Coop Himmelb(l)au, Austria
- Cooper Carry, United States
- Cooper, Robertson & Partners, United States
- Corgan, United States
- Costas Kondylis and Partners, LLP, United States
- Cram and Ferguson, United States

== D ==
- DA Architects + Planners, Canada
- Dar Al-Handasah, Beirut | Cairo | London | Pune
- Davis Brody Bond, United States | Brazil
- Deborah Berke & Partners Architects
- Denton Corker Marshall, Australia
- Diamond and Schmitt Architects, Canada
- Dico si Tiganas, Romania
- Diener & Diener, Switzerland
- Diller Scofidio + Renfro, United States
- Dissing + Weitling, Denmark
- Dixon Jones, United Kingdom
- Donaldson and Meier, United States
- Dorte Mandrup Architects, Denmark

== E ==
- Ellerbe Becket, United States

== F ==
- F+A Architects, United States
- Farrells, United Kingdom and Hong Kong
- Fender Katsalidis Architects, Australia
- Fiske & Meginnis, Nebraska, United States
- Flad Architects, United States
- FMA Architects, Nigeria, South Africa
- Foster and Partners, United Kingdom
- FRCH Design Worldwide, United States
- Future Systems (1982–2009), United Kingdom

== G ==
- Gehl Architects, Denmark
- Gensler, United States
- Gerkan, Marg and Partners, Germany
- Gillespie, Kidd & Coia, Scotland
- Glenn Howells, United Kingdom
- GRAFT, United States
- Graham, Anderson, Probst & White, United States
- Greene and Greene, United States
- Gregory Henriquez, Canada
- Gregory Phillips Architects, United Kingdom
- Grimshaw, United Kingdom
- Guida Moseley Brown Architects, Australia
- Gwathmey Siegel, United States

== H ==
- Handel Architects, United States
- Hampshire County Architects, United Kingdom
- Harley Ellis Devereaux, United States
- Hassell, Australia
- Haworth Tompkins, United Kingdom
- Hazen and Robinson, Nebraska, United States
- HDR, Inc., Nebraska, United States
- H. E. and A. Bown. United Kingdom
- Heikkinen – Komonen Architects, Finland
- Henn GmbH, Germany
- Henning Larsen Architects, Denmark
- Herzog & de Meuron, Switzerland
- HKS, Inc., United States
- HNTB Corporation, United States
- Hodgetts + Fung, United States
- Hoffmann Architects, United States
- HOK, North America, Europe, Asia-Pacific, India, Middle East
- Holabird & Roche/Holabird & Root, United States
- Hollmén Reuter Sandman, Finland
- Hudson Architects, United Kingdom

== I ==
- iArc, South Korea
- IBI Group, Canada
- Ingenhoven Architects, Germany
- Integrated Design Associates (IDA), Hong Kong

== J ==
- Jaeger Kahlen Partner, Germany, Italy, China
- Jestico + Whiles, United Kingdom
- JLG Architects, United States
- John Robertson Architects, London, United Kingdom
- Johnston Marklee & Associates, United States
- Johnsen Schmaling Architects, United States

== K ==
- Sunita Kohli, (K2India – Kohelika Kohli Architects and Designers Pvt Ltd), India
- Karen Bausman + Associates, United States
- Kemp, Bunch & Jackson (KBJ), United States
- Kimmel Eshkolot Architects, Israel
- Kirksey, United States
- Kohn Pedersen Fox (KPF), United States
- Koning Eizenberg Architecture, Inc. (KEA), United States

== L ==
- Leo A Daly, United States
- Lifschutz Davidson Sandilands, Great Britain
- Line and Space, United States
- Link Arkitektur, Norway
- Little Diversified Architectural Consulting, United States
- LMN Architects, United States
- Longfellow, Alden & Harlow, United States
- Loyn & Co, Wales, United Kingdom
- Lyons, Australia

== M ==
- MacGabhann Architects, Ireland
- Mackenzie Wheeler Architects and Designers, United Kingdom
- Manica Architecture, United States
- Marshall and Fox, United States
- Mathews & Associates Architects, South Africa
- MBH Architects, United States
- McKim, Mead & White, United States
- Mecanoo, Netherlands
- Messana O'Rorke, United States
- Metron, Switzerland
- Michael Green Architecture, Canada
- Miller and Pflueger (1923–37), United States
- Miller / Hull, United States
- Mithun, United States
- Moriyama & Teshima, Canada
- Morphogenesis, India
- Morphosis, United States
- muf architecture/art, United Kingdom
- Muhlenberg Greene Architects, United States
- MulvannyG2 Architecture, United States
- MVRDV, Netherlands

== N ==
- NBBJ, United States
- Neutelings Riedijk Architects, Netherlands
- Norman and Dawbarn, UK

== O ==
- Office for Metropolitan Architecture (OMA), Netherlands
- O'Donnell & Tuomey, Ireland
- Omrania and Associates, Saudi Arabia

== P ==
- Pascall+Watson, United Kingdom
- Patkau Architects, Canada
- Pearson and Darling, Canada
- Pei Cobb Freed & Partners, United States
- Percy Thomas Partnership (c. 1912–2004), United Kingdom
- Perkins&Will, United States
- Perkins Eastman, United States
- Peter Chermayeff LLC, United States
- Peter Tolkin Architecture, United States
- PLH Architects, Denmark
- PLP Architecture, United Kingdom
- Populous, United States
- Pugin & Pugin (c. 1851–1928), United Kingdom

== R ==
- R.E. Chisholm Architects, United States
- RAMSA, United States
- Rapp & Rapp, United States
- RDH Architects, Canada
- Renzo Piano, Italy France
- Reynolds, Smith & Hills (RS&H), United States
- Rex Architecture P.C., United States
- RHWL, United Kingdom
- Rogers Stirk Harbour + Partners, United Kingdom
- Ricardo Bofill Taller de Arquitectura, Spain
- RMJM, United Kingdom

== S ==
- SAMOO Architects & Engineers, Republic of Korea
- SANAA, Japan
- Sauerbruch Hutton, Germany
- Schmidt hammer lassen, Denmark
- Schultze and Weaver, United States
- Shepley, Rutan and Coolidge, United States
- Shilpa Architects, India & United States
- SHoP Architects, United States
- Shore Tilbe Irwin + Partners, Canada
- Skidmore, Owings and Merrill (SOM), United States
- Smith Hinchman & Grylls, United States
- Snøhetta, Norway
- SOMA, United States
- Studio Gang Architects, United States
- Synthesis Design + Architecture, United States
- Sundukovy Sisters Design Studio, Russia

== T ==
- Tate Snyder Kimsey Architects, United States
- terrain:loenhart&mayr, Germany
- Tod Williams Billie Tsien Architects
- Troppo Architects, Australia
- Trost & Trost, United States
- Terry Farrell, United Kingdom
- T Sakhi, Lebanon

== U ==
- UNStudio, Netherlands
- Urban Design Group, United States
- Ushida Findlay Architects, Japan/UK

== V ==
- Van Der Merwe Miszewski Architects, South Africa
- Vandkunsten, Denmark
- Vignelli Associates, United States; Italy
- Voorhees, Gmelin and Walker, United States

== W ==
- Walker & Weeks, United States
- Weiss/Manfredi, United States
- West 8, Netherlands
- White, Sweden, Denmark, Norway, United Kingdom
- WilkinsonEyre, United Kingdom
- Wittehaus, United States
- WOHA, Singapore
- Wood Marsh, Australia
- Woods Bagot, Australia
- Woollen, Molzan and Partners, United States
- Warren & Mahoney, New Zealand
- WZMH Architects, Canada

== Y ==
- York and Sawyer, United States
- Yamasaki & Associates, United States

== Z ==
- Zaha Hadid Architects, United Kingdom

== See also ==
- List of British architecture firms
