= List of British architecture firms =

This list of British architecture firms includes notable architecture practices (or companies known for their architectural output) founded and/or headquartered in the United Kingdom.

== A–M ==
- ABK, founded 1961
- AL_A, founded 2009
- Allies and Morrison, founded 1984
- Archigram, architectural collective active c. 1962–1964
- Architects' Co-Partnership founded 1939
- Arup, founded 1946
- Ash Sakula Architects, founded 1996
- Assael Architecture, founded 1994
- Bennetts Associates, founded 1987
- Benoy, founded 1947
- Benson & Forsyth
- H. E. and A. Bown, founded between 1868 and 1870
- Bradshaw Gass & Hope, founded 1862
- Brian Ring, Howard & Partners, founded 1958
- Broadway Malyan, founded 1956
- Building Design Partnership (BDP), founded 1964
- Buro Happold, founded 1976
- Caruso St John, founded 1990
- Chamberlin, Powell and Bon, founded 1952
- Chapman Taylor Architects, founded 1959
- EPR Architects, founded 1947
- Edgingtons Architects (Edgington Spink & Hyne Ltd), founded 1856
- FAT (Fashion Architecture Taste) established 1990s
- Farrells, founded 1965
- Foster + Partners, founded 1967
- Future Systems, founded 1982 and ceased operation in 2009 after Jan Kaplický's death.
- Gillespie, Kidd & Coia, founded 1927, wound up 1987
- Glenn Howells Architects, founded 1990
- GMW Architects, founded 1948
- Gregory Phillips Architects, founded 1991
- Grimshaw Architects, founded 1980
- Habershon and Fawckner, active c.1870 – c.1891
- Hackett Hall McKnight, founded in Belfast in 2008
- Hampshire County Architects
- Haworth Tompkins, founded 1991
- H. E. and A. Bown founded 1877
- Hopkins Architects, founded 1976
- Hudson Architects
- Information Based Architecture, founded 1998
- Jestico + Whiles, founded 1977
- John Robertson Architects, founded 1993
- Lifschutz Davidson Sandilands, founded 1986
- Loyn & Co, founded 1987
- MacCormac Jamieson Prichard, founded 1972
- Maccreanor Lavington, founded 1992
- MacGibbon and Ross, founded 1872, wound up 1914
- Mackenzie Wheeler Architects and Designers, founded 1986
- Make Architects, founded 2004
- Morris and Steedman, founded 1952
- muf, founded 1994

== N–Z ==
- Pascall+Watson, founded 1956
- Percy Thomas Partnership, founded c.1912, bought by Capita Group in 2004
- Pringle Richards Sharratt, founded 1996
- Proctor and Matthews Architects
- Pugin & Pugin, active c.1851 to c.1928
- RMJM, founded 1956
- Richard Rogers Partnership, founded 1977 and renamed Rogers Stirk Harbour + Partners in 2007
- Scott Brownrigg, founded 1910
- Seymour Harris Partnership
- Sheppard, Robson and Partners, founded 1938
- Alison and Peter Smithson
- Studio Saar
- Ushida Findlay Architects, founded in Japan in 1986, but headquartered in London
- Wilkinson Eyre, founded 1983
- Zaha Hadid Architects, founded 1980

== See also ==
- List of architecture firms
- Royal Institute of British Architects
