= Dietmar Eberle =

Austrian architect

Dietmar Eberle (31 October 1952 in Hittisau) is an Austrian architect. Winner of over 150 national and international competitions, he has been a teacher in several universities in North America and Europe. Since 1999 he has been Professor at the ETH Zurich, becoming the Dean of the School of Architecture within the same university between 2003 and 2005. He has also been head of the Center of Housing and Sustainable Urban Development at the ETH Zurich.

== Biography ==
Eberle enrolled at the Technische Universität Wien as a student of architecture in 1973 and graduated under Anton Schweighofer in 1978. Having completed his studies, he worked in Tehran where he was involved in a town planning study and new town planning.

One of a group of young architects who studied in Vienna in the 1970s, Eberle returned to Vorarlberg in the 1980s to carry out building projects. He is one of the founding members of the Vorarlberg Architects. While still an undergraduate, he teamed up with Markus Koch, Norbert Mittersteiner and Wolfgang Juen in 1979 to found the Cooperative Bau- und Planungsgesellschaft (1979-1982). The Im Fang project was the sign of "a new, alternative building philosophy" and sent out an important signal at this time.

The architectural practice of Eberle Egger was founded in 1982. This was followed in 1985 by co-operation between Baumschlager and Eberle in the architectural practice of Baumschlager-Eberle. Launched in Vorarlberg, the practice is well established in Austria and now carries out projects in Europe and Asia. Eberle has described the specific quality of the architecture aspired to by the practice. "Architecture involves abstracting the practical value onto a cultural plane. A space is thus opened up for the cultural positioning of architecture and for individual visions which goes beyond the specific requirements of a building. The architect's responsibility lies in the considerable commitment of resources and the temporal dimension of the social impact of buildings and the urban fabric. Personal creativity does not relieve the architect of his responsibility towards society." The architectural practice is a network of international offices run by Eberle with eleven partners. The offices, located at twelve sites in eight different countries in Europe and Asia, have completed well over 400 buildings.

Eberle has taught regularly at a number of universities since the 1980s. He has been a visiting professor, inter alia, in Hanover, Vienna, Linz, Syracuse (New York) and Darmstadt. In addition, he has taught in Madrid, Jerusalem, Hong Kong and Barcelona.

Since 1999, Eberle has been a full professor for architecture and design at the ETH Zurich and was in charge of the ETH Wohnforum until 2015. He was head of the Department of Architecture from 2003 to 2006.

== Literature ==
- Walden Gert (ed.), Baumschlager Eberle Annäherungen | Approaches (2010): Über das architektonische Denken von Baumschlager-Eberle.
- Millî Reasürans (ed.), Architektur hat Bestand, Architecture sustains. Baumschlager Eberle.
- Winfried Nerdinger: Baumschlager-Eberle 2002–2007 Architektur, Menschen und Ressourcen; Architecture | People and Resources.
- Kunsthaus Bregenz (ed.), Baumschlager & Eberle, Hafengebäude Rohner Fussach | Harbour Building Rohner Fussach.
- Liesbeth Waechter-Böhm. Bauten und Projekte 1996-2002 | Buildings and Projects.
- Kristin Freireiss, Hans-Jürgen Commerell, Baumschlager & Eberle 1996-2002. Vom Regionalem und internationalem. Of regional and international; Aedes East Forum, 2003
- Mythos der Einfachheit, Das Martinspark Hotel in Dornbirn der Architekten Baumschlager / Eberle.
- Monica GIli, Baumschlager Eberle. Nexus. Conversacion con / A conversation with Carlo Baumschlager und Dietmar Eberle, 2G Revista International de Arquitectura - International Architecture Review, GG Editorial Gustavo GIl SA, Barcelona, 1999
- Lee Uje, Baumschlager and Eberle 1992 - 1999, C3 Design Group, Korea, 1999
- Giacinto Cerviere, Baumschlager & Eberle - Profondita plastiche ed estetiche del neutro. Aesthetic and plastic profoundness of the neutral.
- Liesbeth Waechter-Böhm: Carlo Baumschlager. Dietmar Eberle
