= Cool Capital Biennale =

Biennale in Pretoria, South Africa

The Cool Capital Biennale is a citywide art, architecture and design biennale convened by Pieter Mathews. This bi-annual event is held in the City of Pretoria and allows for anyone to contribute something creative, being an "uncurated, DIY, guerrilla biennale". It aims to bring change to Pretoria and expose residents to art, architecture and design. It is web based, with a catalogue being published at the end of each event year. Interventions include:

- Showing of Pretoria-focused films.
- Bus tours (e.g. to Marabastad).
- Visiting buildings that are usually not open to the public.
- "Gallery Crawling".
- An urban party in the CBD.
- Poetry in malls.
- The Dutch Footsteps website.
- Sculpture exhibitions.
