= Mathews & Associates Architects =

South African architecture firm

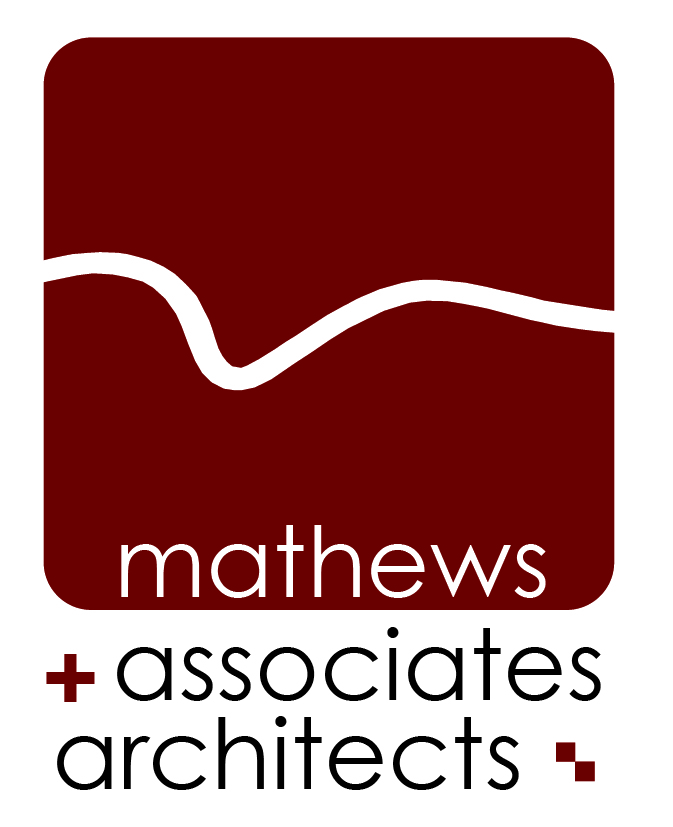
Mathews & Associates Architects Logo

Mathews & Associates Architects is an architecture firm based in Pretoria, South Africa, known for contextually relevant and graphic designs.

== History ==
The firm was established in 2000 by Pieter J Mathews and it has been involved in a wide variety of buildings ranging from large-scale buildings for tertiary institutions to transport architecture.

== Principal: Pieter J Mathews ==
Pieter Mathews
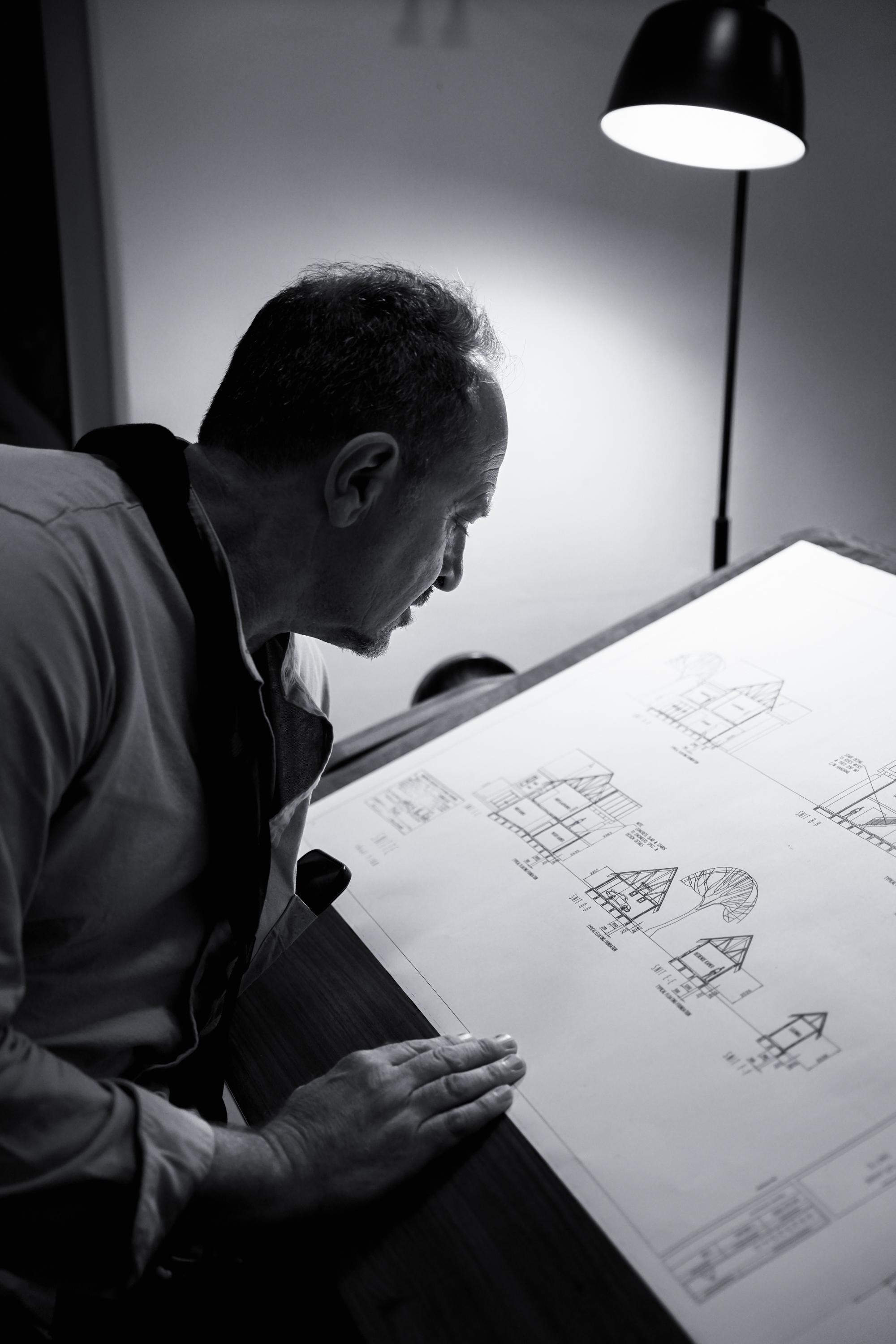
- Mathews in 2025
- Born: Pieter J Mathews; 24 February 1967 (age 59); Lichtenburg, North West
- Education: University of Pretoria
- Occupation: Architect
- Practice: Mathews & Associates Architects
- Website: www.maaa.co.za

=== Life and career ===
Pieter Mathews, (24 February 1967), is an architect living and working in Pretoria, South Africa. He is principal of the firm Mathews & Associates Architects.

Mathews grew up in Lichtenburg and studied architecture at the University of Pretoria. He finished his BArch-degree in 1991, obtaining the Gold Fields of South Africa Scholarship for Architecture. After his third year of study he travelled abroad to gain international work experience. In 1989, he completed part of his practical training in London (Bruce Gilbreth & Triad Architects) after which he travelled to Europe, USA (New York and California), Thailand, Hong Kong and Turkey. At Bruce Gilbreth he was involved with the Centre at Capability Green in Luton and at Triad Architects, Frimley High Street office building as well as a residential project for the government of Gibraltar.

He completed his practical training in South Africa at Holm Jordaan Holm under the direction of Dieter Holm and Gerrit Jordaan. In 1994, Mathews became partner at Nel Storm Architects in Pretoria followed by a partnership with Jacques Gerber (Mathews and Gerber Architects ) from December 1995 to November 2000.

In 2000, Mathews started the architecture firm, Mathews & Associates Architects, and the firm operated from an old post office building in Waterkloof. The firm received numerous merit awards for their buildings, and has been invited to appear on various television stations. Projects by the office have been exhibited internationally in Venice and São Paulo and published in numerous publications. Mathews has written and contributed to numerous books on architecture, his first being Architexture, a book on the use of textures in buildings. It was followed by Detail Housed, after which he was the publishing manager for Construction Primer, by Hans Wegelin, and the editor for Contemporary Capital. He has since then published numerous other books including #Cool Capital, Cool Capital Guerrilla Design Magazine, Saadjies and The Sample Workshop which were edited or compiled by Mathews. In 2021 Musings, a retrospective of the oeuvre by MAAA over two decades, was published by Protea Boekhuis. He also writes about architecture and design for local South African magazines.

In 2013, he formed part of a study tour to visit museums and galleries in the US, organised by the Andrew W Mellon Foundation. The tour included visits to YALE, NYU, Princeton, Penn, Rutgers, as well as the Metropolitan, MOMA and the Guggenheim Museum. This visit culminated in the design and construction of the Javett Art Gallery at the University of Pretoria, which will open its doors in 2019. Mathews was President of the Pretoria Institute for Architecture (PIA) from 2013 to 2014, and was a board member of SAIA (South African Institute of architects) in 2013.

In 2012 and 2013, Mathews was invited to join Southern Guild, for which he designed benches as part of their annual exhibitions. His design for a concrete bench (together with Santie Gouws, Grietjie Lee and the late Sybrand Wiechers) was included in PPC Cement's REIMAGINE CONCRETE Young Concrete Sculptor Awards Competition exhibition. In 2002, he was invited by House and Leisure magazine to design a drinks tray for Absolut Vodka. Mathews was the convenor for the Cool Capital Biennale. In 2012, he received the Zero Hour Credential from the University of Pretoria's Department of Architecture for his contribution to the department. Mathews was listed as one of South Africa's star architects by House and Leisure magazine in 2011. In 2008, he was included in VISI magazine's People with Vision list of architects.

Pieter Mathews completed his practiced-based Master’s study in Architecture at the University of the Free State in 2019 and has completed his PhD in Architecture with Specialization in Design at the same institution in 2023.

== Notable projects ==
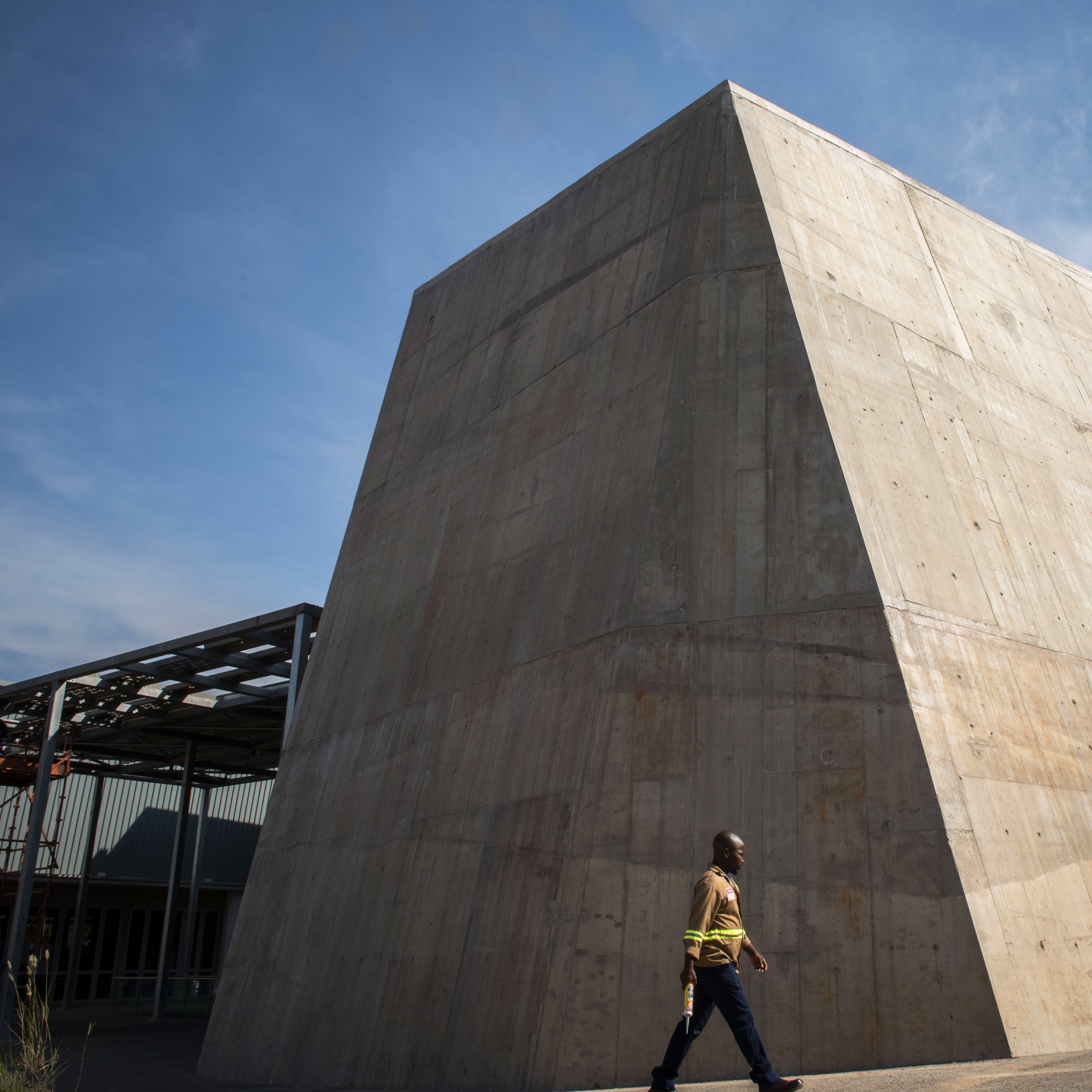
Mapungubwe mountain at the Javett Art Centre at UP

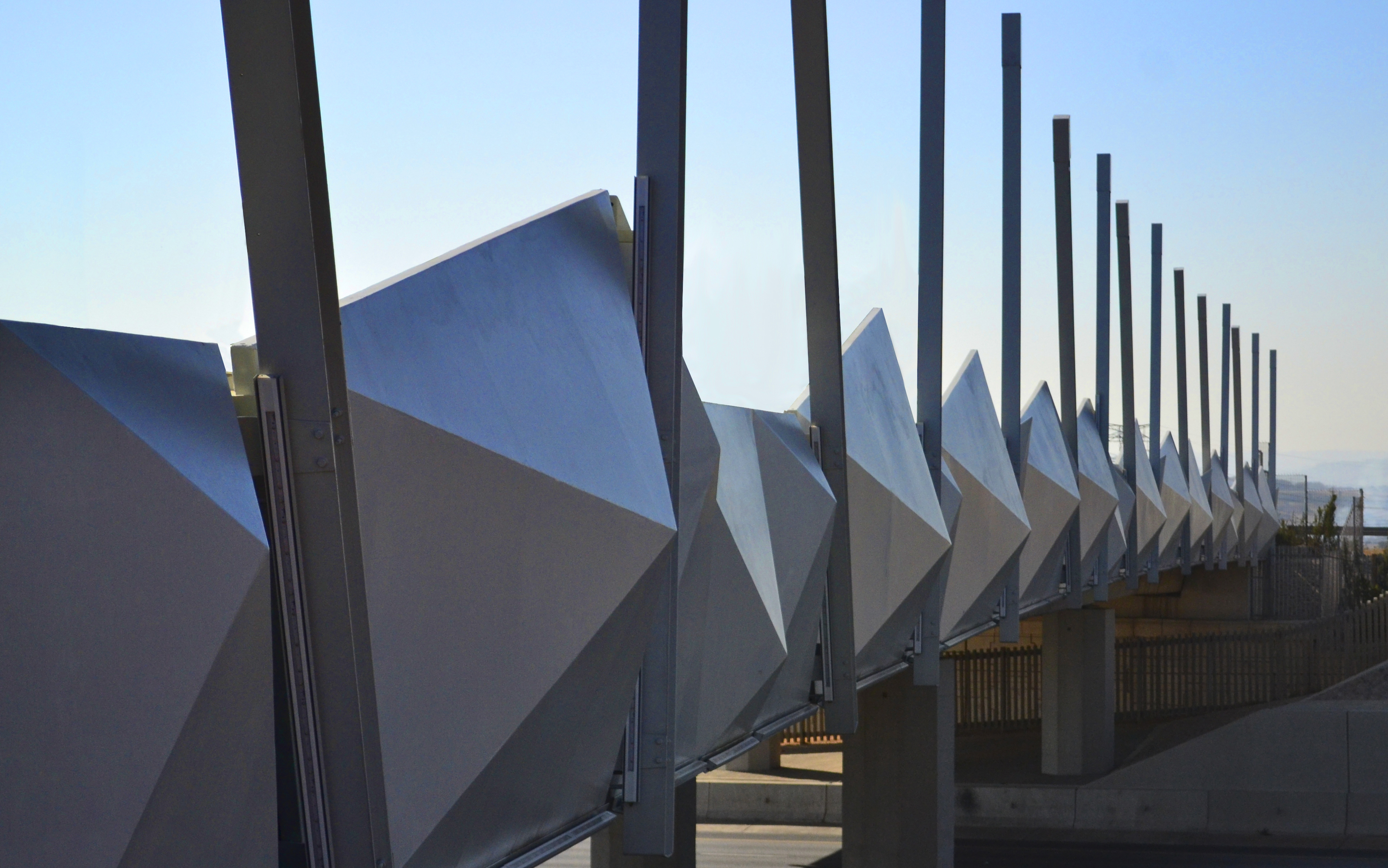
View of Nellmapius Bridge

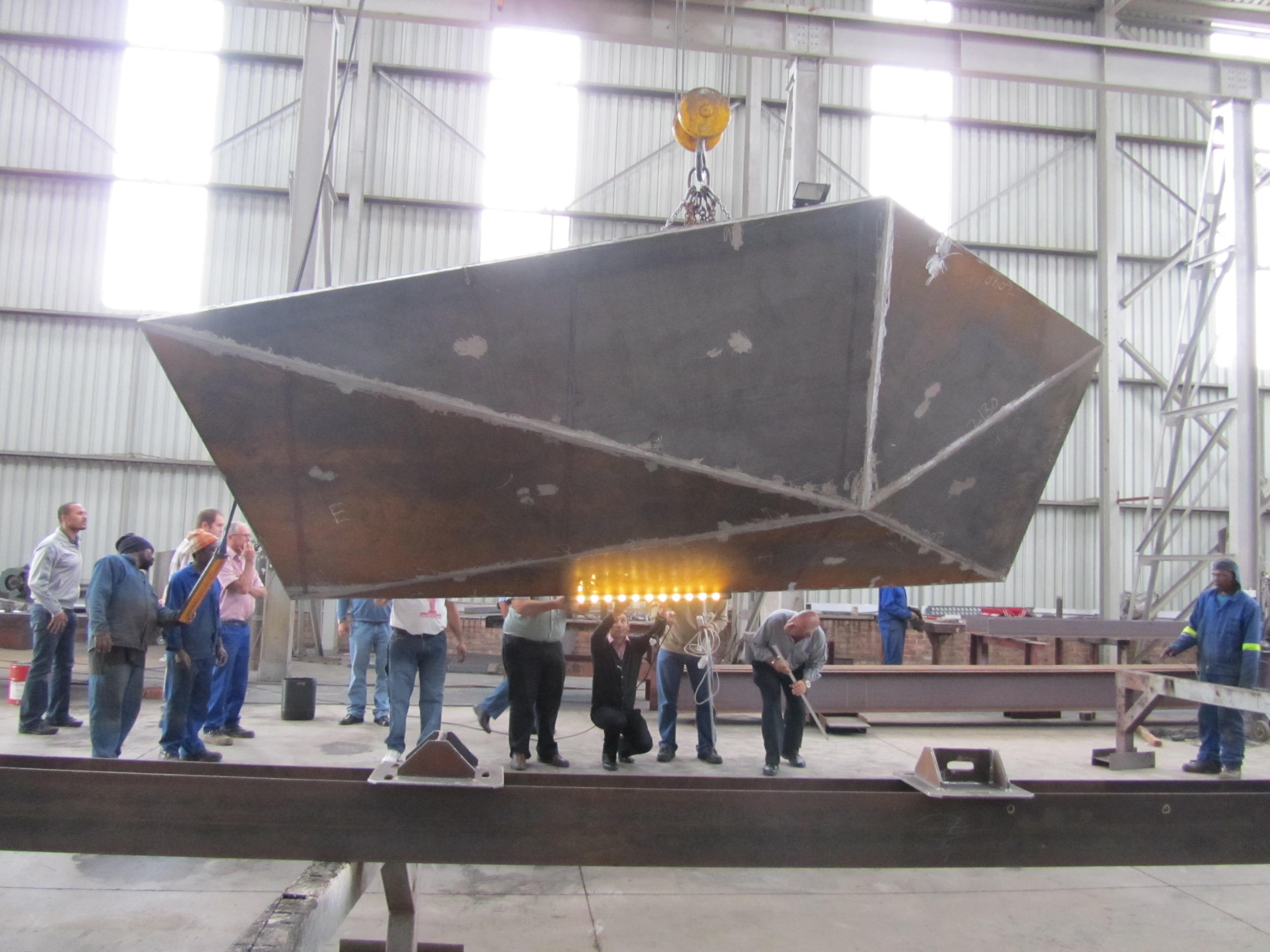
Steel panel for Nellmapius Bridge

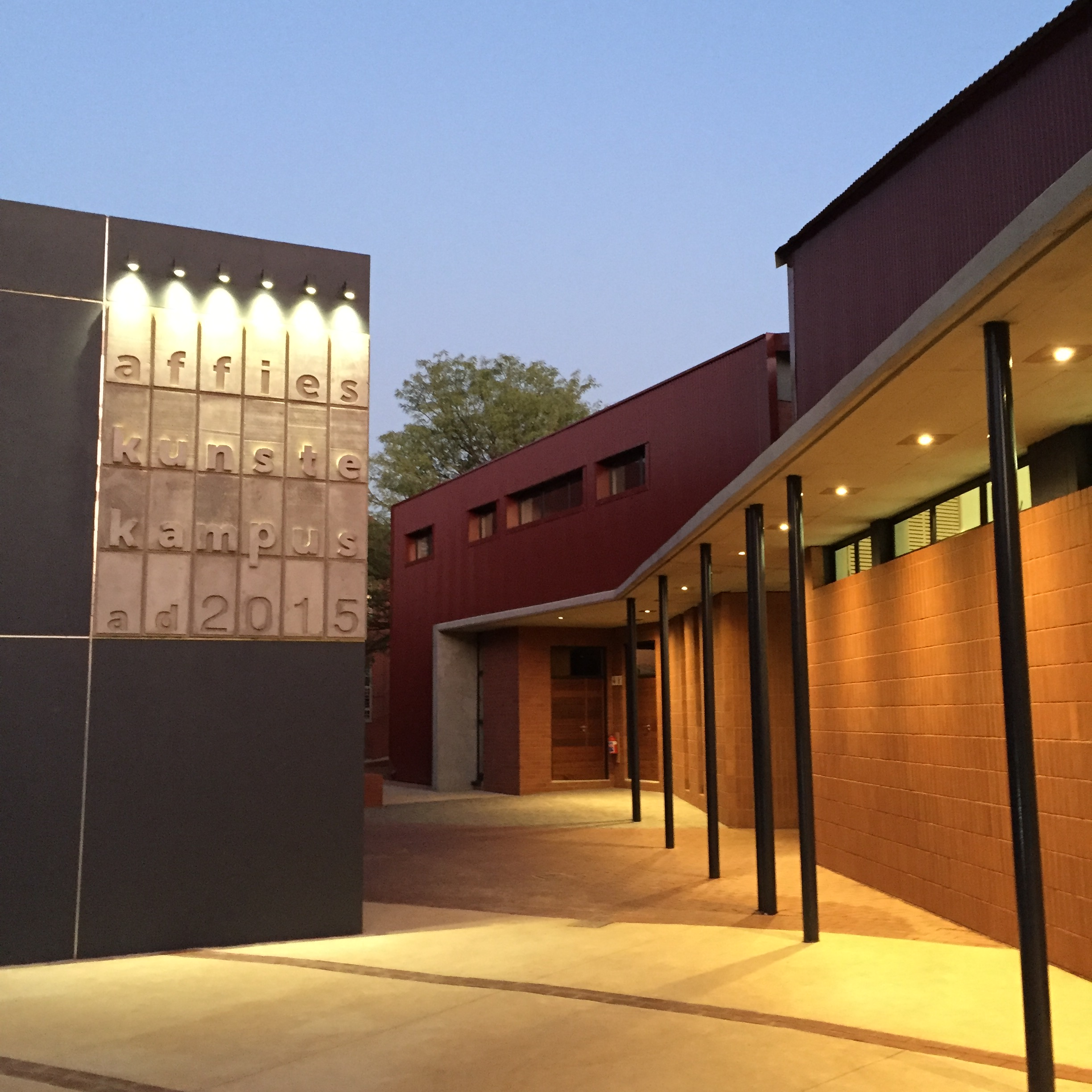
Afrikaanse Hoër Seunskool | Art Campus

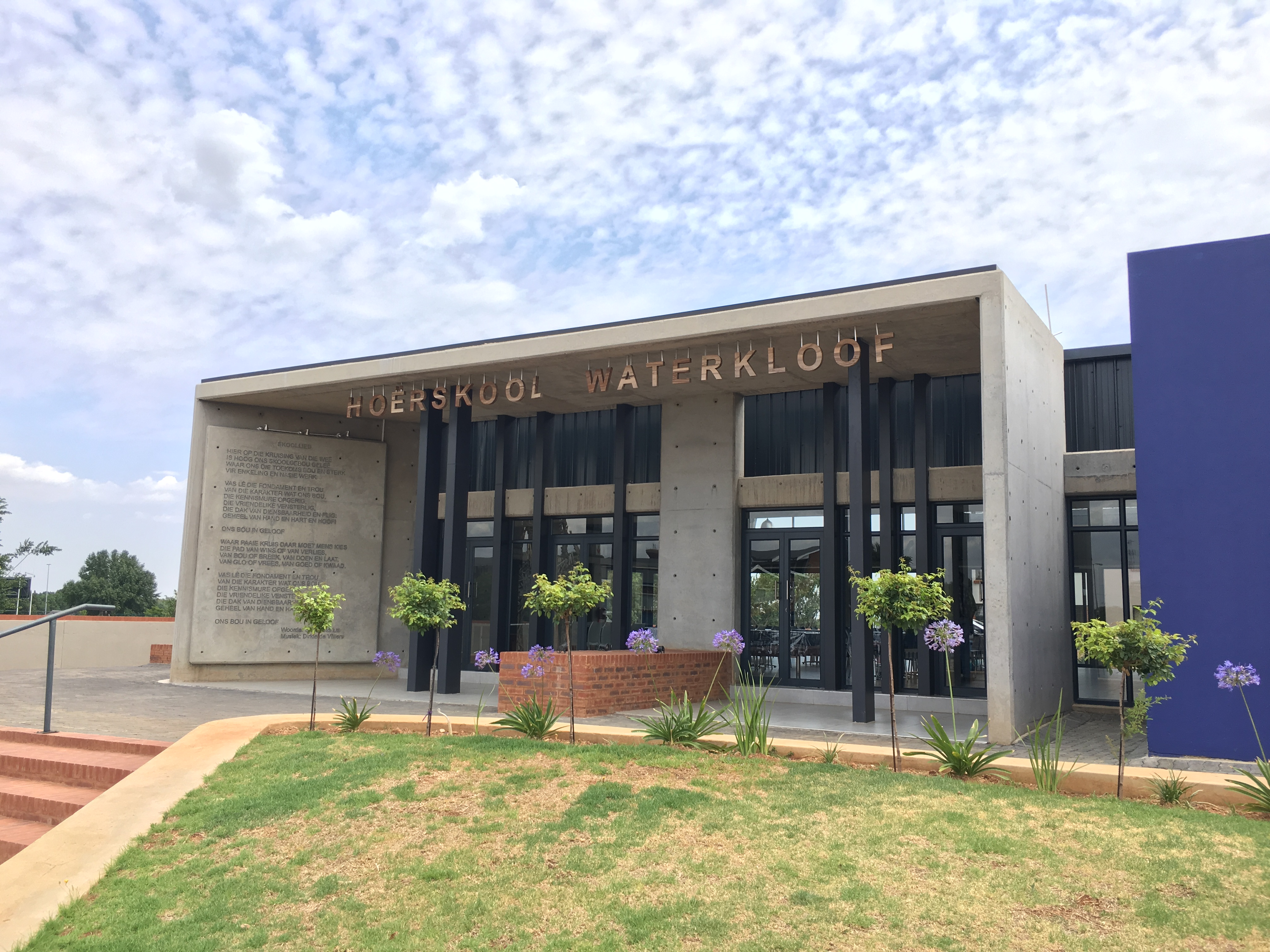
Hoërskool Waterkloof | Multi-purpose hall and student residence

=== Educational ===
- North West University | Vanderbijlpark Campus | New administration Building (2021) North West Province
- Javett-UP Art Centre at the University of Pretoria| New African Art Gallery and Museum Complex (2019), Gauteng
- Afrikaanse Hoër Meisieskool Pretoria | Student centre (2017), Gauteng
- Afrikaanse Hoër Meisieskool Pretoria | Swimming pool (2015), Gauteng
- Afrikaanse Hoër Seunskool | Art Campus (2015)
- Hoërskool Waterkloof | Multi-purpose hall and student residence (2013), Gauteng
- Afrikaanse Hoër Meisieskool Pretoria | Additions and alterations to the EC Steijn Hall (2012), Gauteng
- Afrikaanse Hoër Meisieskool Pretoria | Sport complex (2012), Gauteng
- Laerskool Pretoria-Oos | After care facility (2009), Tennis clubhouse (2010), Gauteng
- Damelin | Tertiary education campus (2005) North West Province

=== Transport ===
- Baobab Toll Plaza (2004), Limpopo, in association with Karlien Thomashoff
- N4 Diamond Hill Toll Plaza (2006), Mpumalanga
- Nellmapius Bridge (2011), Gauteng
- Tshwane Rapid Bus Station | Memory Box (2013), Gauteng
- Hector Pieterson Bus Station (2018), Gauteng
- Musina Bridge (2022), Limpopo

=== Commercial ===
- Oaktree Studios (2016), Gauteng
- Numerous garages for NTT Toyota (2008–current), Mpumalanga and North West
- Brauhaus am Damm (2012), North West
- Fusion Boutique Hotel (2009), Limpopo
- KEE Enterprises (Pty) Ltd (2009), Gauteng
- SARS (Note: SARS refers to the South African Revenue Service) Regional Head Office, Rustenburg (2006), North West

== Architectural Language ==
Mathews & Associates Architects began as a practice specialising mainly in the residential market but redirected its prime focus away from this market segment, towards transport, education and non-standard commercial projects. The firm has received widespread acclaim in South Africa and increasingly internationally for its holistic approach to design, which embraces unconventional use of texture and sculptural form. The firm's design ethos remains bold and innovative simplicity using honest and raw materials that reflect the African context. The firm's architectural language has been described as "a sculptural combination between stereotomic and tectonic architectural languages".

== La Biennale di Venezia ==
In 2016, Mathews & Associates was appointed as the curators for the South African Pavilion at La Biennale di Venezia. The 15th Biennale was directed by Alejandro Aravena. The South African representation was commissioned by the South African Consul-General in Milan, Saul Kgomotso Molobi, who described the exhibition as historic in the sense that the curator did not take a few exclusive works of architects’ or artists’, but the projects of over 1000 South African participants, probably making this one of the most representative pavilions in the history of South Africa's involvement with the Biennale.

The South African Pavilion pavilion concept responded to the theme by exhibiting the work of hundreds of South Africans who participated in a project called Cool Capital. The 2016 was exhibition was the first South African Pavilion to feature in the official catalogue that printed and distributed by the Biennale Foundation in Venice. Cool Capital's intent was unpretentious and simple: dismantle the bureaucratic relationship between citizens and public space in order to free creativity. Citizens were encouraged to rediscover marginalized and forgotten parts of the city, to collaborate and to become active agents in the rethinking of Pretoria as home, place, destination, and capital city. Cool Capital demonstrated what can be gained when citizens are provided with an unofficial opportunity to constructively engage with issues they identify in the realm of architecture, art, and design. The pavilion becomes a call to citizens of any city to become design activists. In accordance with the uncurated, DIY nature of Cool Capital, the South African exhibition was inclusive and democratic; representing the work of hundreds of innovative participants.

Mathews' appointment as curator of the South African Pavilion in 2016 was preceded by another installation by Mathews and Associates that was exhibited in 2012 at the 13th Biennale Architettura. A lightbox installation designed by Mathews was exhibited as part of the "Traces of Centuries & Future Steps" exhibition held at the Palazzo Bembo and organized by the GAA Foundation.

== Awards ==
- 2005: LIA Merit Award - Baobab Toll Plaza (Note: LIA refers to the Limpopo Institute for Architecture)
- 2005: MPIA Merit Award - House Millar (Note: MPIA refers to the Mpumalanga Institute of Architects)
- 2005: PIA Merit Award - N4 Diamond Hill Toll Plaza, in association with K. Thomashoff
- 2005: SAISC (Note: PIA refers to the Pretoria Institute for Architecture) - Overall Winner - N4 Diamond Hill Toll Plaza, in association with K. Thomashoff
- 2005: PIA President's Award - Publication - Architexture
- 2006: SAIA (Note: SAISC refers to the South African Institute of Steel Construction) Merit Award - Baobab Tollgate (Note: SAIA refers to the South African Institute of Architects)
- 2006: SAIA Merit Award - N4 Diamond Hill Toll Plaza, in association with K. Thomashoff
- 2006: SAIA Merit Award - House Millar
- 2009: PIA Commendation - KEE Enterprises (Pty) Ltd
- 2009: PIA Peers Award First place - KEE Enterprises (Pty) Ltd
- 2011: LIA Commendation - Fusion Boutique Hotel
- 2011: PIA Commendation - House Oosthuizen
- 2011: PIA Commendation - House Taylor
- 2013: PIA Commendation - Afrikaanse Hoër Meisieskool Pretoria – New sports facility
- 2013: PIA Commendation - Nellmapius Bridge
- 2013: PIA Merit Award - Afrikaanse Hoër Meisieskool Pretoria - Hall
- 2013: PIA Merit Award - House Fouché
- 2015: PIA Commendation - Transportation - Nana Sita Station
- 2015: PIA President's Award - Cool Capital Initiative
- 2017: SAIA Merit Award - Afrikaans Hoër Seunskool Art Campus
- 2017: PIA Best Education Building - Afrikaans Hoër Seunskool Art Campus
- 2017: PIA Merit Award - Mixed Use Development - Oaktree Studio
- 2017: PIA Commendation - Transportation - Tshwane Rapid Bus Station
- 2018: SAIA Best Education Building - Afrikaans Hoër Seunskool Art Campus
- 2021: PIA Merit Award - Albe's Barn

=== Other ===
- 2002: Dulux Colour Awards - Finalist – House Nixon
- 2005: Selected for Exhibition Miami + Beach Biennale in Florida, USA - House Millar, House Mathews and House Clacey
- 2009: City of Tshwane BRT national competition: winner of one of the station types
- 2012: Selected to be part of the "Traces of Centuries & Future Steps" exhibition at the 2012 Venice Architecture Biennale
- 2013: House & Leisure: May 2013 House of the month: House Fouché
- 2015: BASA (Note: BASA refers to the Business and Arts South Africa) Innovation Award: PPC Public Bench Project
- 2015: Loeries (Note: Loeries refers to the Loeries Ubuntu Awards) Finalist - Cool Capital Project
- 2017: BASA Small Business Award - Saadjies Travelling Sculpture Exhibition
- 2018: Die Suid-Afrikaanse Akademie vir Wetenskap en Kuns - Medal of honour for visual arts (architecture) Pieter J Mathews
