= Sierra Towers =

Residential tower in Los Angeles, California

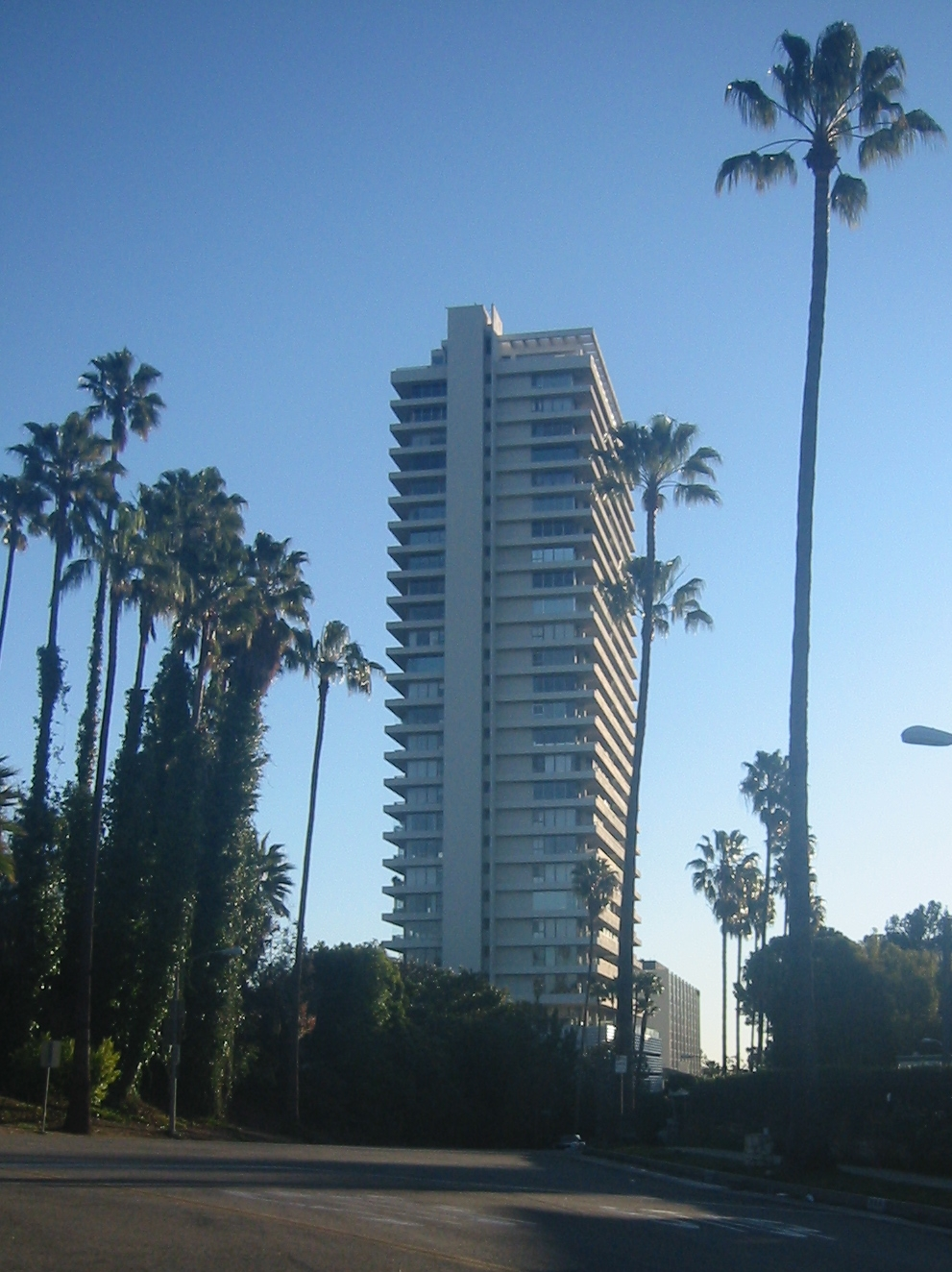
- Sierra Towers from Doheny Road

General information
- Type: Residential
- Location: 9255 Doheny Road; West Hollywood, California, United States
- Coordinates: 34.090616°N 118.394289°W
- Opening: 1966
- Cost: $12,000,000

Technical details
- Floor count: 31
- Lifts/elevators: 3

Design and construction
- Architect: Jack A. Charney
- Developer: Walter and Leo Minskoff

Sierra Towers is a residential 31-story high-rise condominium building in West Hollywood, California, United States. located at 9255 Doheny Road, adjacent to Beverly Hills. It was designed by Beverly Hills mid-century modern architect Jack A. Charney, who studied under Richard Neutra and Rudolph Schindler. Completed in 1965 as an apartment building, it was originally called the Spoon Apartment Building.

== Construction ==
Sierra Towers was developed in 1965 for US$12 million (equivalent to $93.4 million in 2025) by Walter and Leo Minskoff, whose family firm also built New York's Minskoff Theatre. The building is known for being more than 15 stories taller than any other building within a 2-mile (3.2 km) radius. Due to Sierra Towers' unique positioning at the base of a hill (the same hill from which Beverly Hills gets its name), the building is the highest residential tower in the greater Los Angeles Area relative to sea level. The building is said to get its plural name from scuttled original plans to build a second tower.

== Notable residents ==
Sierra Towers was first operated as a rental property, but following its purchase by New York real estate investor Helmsley Spear Inc., the building was converted to condominiums in 1974. A number of celebrities own condominiums in the 146-unit building, including Karyn White, Diahann Carroll, Kelly Osbourne, Robert Sherman, Jim Morris, Brody Jenner, Emma Watson, and Meg Whitman (since 2018).

Historically, residents and owners have included: Lindsay Lohan (2006–2007); Matthew Perry (until 2011); PJ Harvey (29th floor, 2003–2018); and Lily Collins (until 2019).

In 2013, singer-actress Cher sold her 2,302 square feet (213.9 square metres) two-story condominium, created by combining two one-bedroom units on the 26th and 27th floors, for US$5.25 million (equivalent to $7.1 million in 2025). In early 2014, Sandra Bullock purchased a 1,672 square feet (155.3 square metres) unit in the southeast corner of the building's 22nd floor for $3.35 million (equivalent to $4.5 million in 2025); in 2017, she bought a second, 2,101 square feet (195.2 square metres) unit on the 20th floor, for $5.13 million (equivalent to $6.6 million in 2025), while placing her original unit on the rental market at the same time, at $22,000 per month (equivalent to $29,000 per month in 2025). Joan Collins's former 2,300 square feet (210 square metres) residence, on the 25th floor, was sold in 2017 for $4.4 million (equivalent to $5.7 million in 2025). In 2020, Courteney Cox sold her 1,315 square feet (122.2 square metres) unit on the same floor for $2.9 million (equivalent to $3.5 million in 2025).

The Wall Street Journal reported that Evan Metropoulos, a principal at his family's investment firm Metropoulos & Co., has bought and sold multiple units in the building. He purchased a unit in 2014 for $3.5 million (equivalent to $4.7 million in 2025), selling it in 2016 for $4.65 million (equivalent to $6.1 million in 2025). He bought two units, to be used as staff quarters, plus two penthouse units, over the course of 2012 to 2015, including expenditures of $30 million (equivalent to $40 million in 2025) to buy and combine the two penthouse units into one unit totalling 7,000 square feet (650 square metres). By 2018, walls had been removed to create the single penthouse unit, but renovations were still incomplete, so Metropoulos – who had, while waiting, purchased a Beverly Hills mansion – listed all his Sierra Towers units for sale at a combined price of $58 million (equivalent to $73.1 million in 2025); the listing was reduced to $33.5 million (equivalent to $39.2 million in 2025) by 2021, when Metropoulos decided to sell the properties by auction, with no reserve price.

In 2023, Katy Perry purchased a penthouse apartment for $11 million.
