= London Festival of Architecture =

Annual event focusing on architecture and design

- Genre: Architecture events, activities and installations
- Frequency: Annually
- Locations: London, England
- Founded: 2004; 22 years ago (as the London Architecture Biennale)
- Website: www.londonfestivalofarchitecture.org

The London Festival of Architecture is a festival specialized in architecture. It takes place annually in London, England, usually through the month of June. It features an extensive range of activities that mainly focus on design and architecture: exhibitions; installations; talks; debates; open studios; tours; family activities; film screenings; student shows, and evenings.

== History and organization ==
The London Festival of Architecture (LFA) is Europe's biggest annual architecture festival. It was founded by former director Peter Murray in 2004. Up until 2006, the festival was only held once every two years and was previously known as the London Architecture Biennale. From 2008 onwards, the festival took place on an annual basis. Ross Rogina serves on the board as the Director of the London Festival of Architecture.

== Themes ==
Themes are chosen each year for the festival.

- 2016: "Community"
- 2017: "Memory"
- 2018: "Identity"
- 2019: "Boundaries"
- 2020: "Power"
- 2021: "Care"
- 2022: "Act"
- 2023: "In Common"

== Key events and highlights ==
- IF_DO Dulwich Picture Gallery pavilion
- The London Festival of Architecture Fringe
- Debates
- Great Architectural Bake-Off
- Exhibition of winning entries to Silvertown Flyover Design Competition
- Craft Community Connection, Studio Saar's exhibition at the Crafts Council gallery, 2024
