= Jaeger Kahlen Partner =

German architectural and design firm

Practice information
- Key architects: Johannes Jaeger, Peter Jaeger, Manfred Jaeger, Johannes Josef Kahlen
- Founded: Cologne, Germany (2007 as Jaeger & Partner)
- No. of employees: 50+
- Location: Aachen, Turin, Shenzhen

Significant works and honors
- Buildings: Guangfa Securities Tower; Shenzhen Archives
- Awards: AIA Chicago (2010)

Website
- www.jkp-architekten.de

Jaeger Kahlen Partner is an international architectural firm which provides urban planning, architecture, interior and design services for clients in the fields of office, residential, culture, interiors and urban realm. The company is based with offices in Germany, Italy, and China. Established in 2007 as Jaeger & Partner, the company became Jaeger Kahlen Partner in 2015 following the successful long-term collaboration with Prof. Johannes Kahlen.

== Recent works ==
Today, Jaeger Kahlen Partner's projects are representing a large diversity of typologies: commercial office buildings, civic and cultural spaces, residential and hospitality developments, educational and research facilities, mixed-use commercial developments and master-panning. In 2011, the company was awarded with AIA Chicago Design Excellence Award in the Unbuilt Design category for their project Shenzhen Archives in partnership with Saltans Architects. Currently their major under-construction project is Nanshan iPark (former NFU Technology Park).

== Selected projects ==
- Guangfa Securities Headquarters, Guangzhou, China (2010–2018): recognized by CTBUH as one of the 20 tallest buildings completed in 2018.

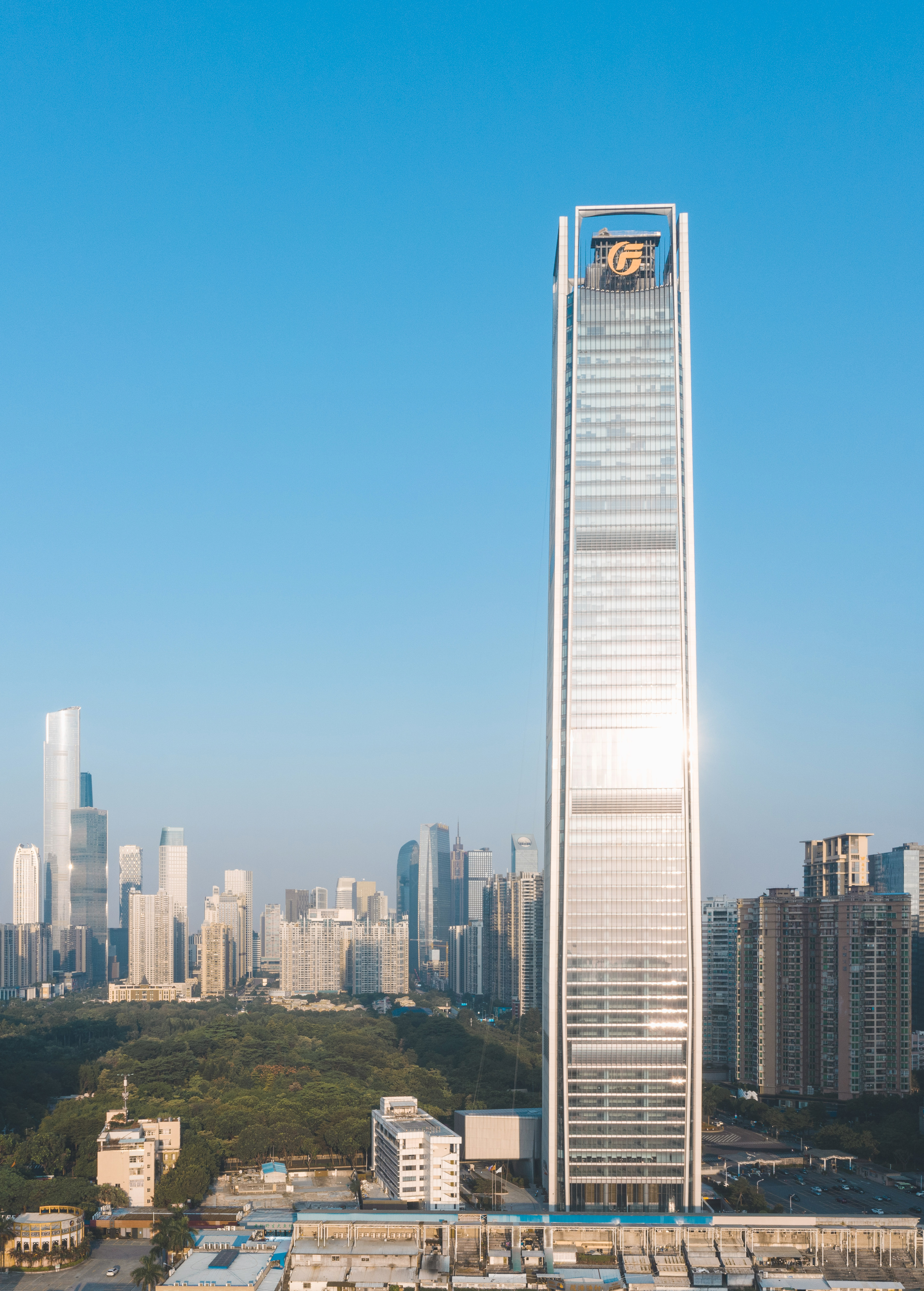
Guangfa Securities Headquarters

- Hybrid Tower (Huitong Tower), Shenzhen, China (2012–2019): office & mechanical car park hybrid tower, currently the largest vertical car park in Shenzhen, China.

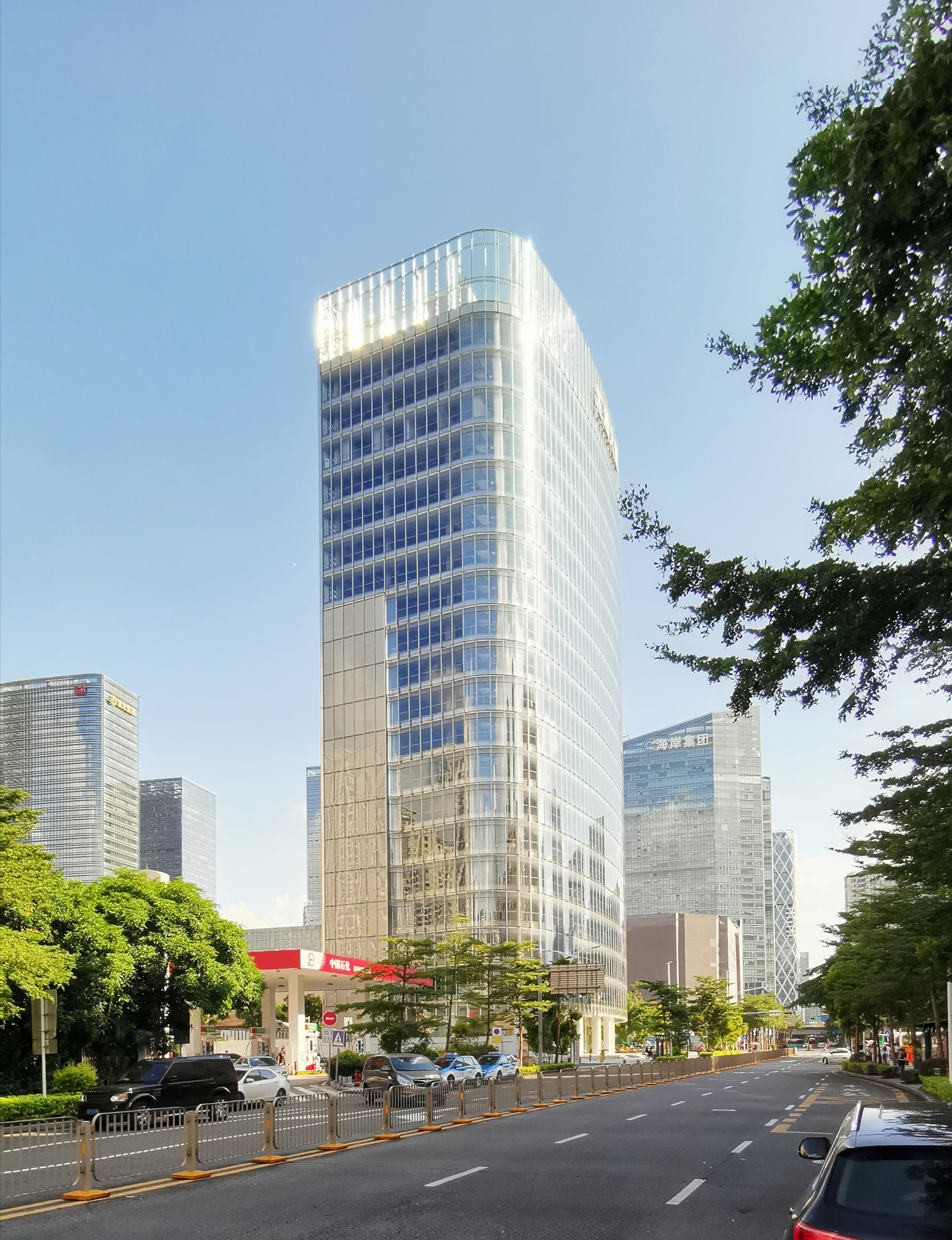
Hybrid Tower

- Nanshan iPark, Shenzhen, China (2009 – Now)

== See also ==
- List of architecture firms
