= Mackenzie Wheeler =

Architectural firm

Mackenzie Wheeler Architects and Designers is an architectural firm and interior design practice based in Shoreditch, London, UK. The practice has produced a number of arts and cultural, educational, hotel, bar, restaurant, commercial and residential projects in the United Kingdom and in Europe, and internationally.

== The firm ==
Mackenzie Wheeler Architects + Designers was established as a partnership in 1986 by Rupert Wheeler and Duncan Mackenzie. The practice employs 15 staff and is headquartered at Redchurch Street in Shoreditch, in the East End of London. The practice is noted for its work in the hotel and spa sector, as well as bars and restaurants, education and cultural projects, and has completed a number of conservation projects on buildings such as the Royal Automobile Club, Pall Mall, London. Mackenzie Wheeler Architects + Designers recently completed a bar with plans for a hotel constructed using shipping containers.

== The partners ==
Rupert Wheeler and Duncan Mackenzie studied at the School of Architecture at Leicester Polytechnic. They were elected to the Royal Institute of British Architects (RIBA) and Architects Registration Board (ARB) in 1982. Duncan Mackenzie had previously worked with Sir Frederic Gibberd and Partners.

== Notable projects ==
Some of the firms most notable projects include:

=== Hotels and spas ===
- Royal Automobile Club, Pall Mall
- The Landmark, Westminster
- Four Seasons, Dogmersfield

=== Restaurants ===
- River Cottage Canteen, Winchester, Plymouth
- Wagamama, United Kingdom
- W’sens, London

=== Bars and pubs ===
- Hall & Woodhouse “Box on the Docks”, Portishead
- The Commander, Notting Hill

=== Education ===
- West Thames College Atrium, London

=== Arts and cultural ===
- Hillingdon Libraries

=== Masterplanning ===
Mackenzie Wheeler Architects + Designers have also completed masterplans for various schemes including Sharm El Sheik town centre, Egypt, Tripoli New Marina, Tripoli and Hemingway Marina, Havana, Cuba.

=== Residential ===
The practice have completed a number of residential developments for private clients, including a Grade II listed Art Deco home at Harley Street, London, Benbow House, Southbank, London, a 1950s house at Fournier Street, London, and Grade II listed Georgian Townhouse at Spitalfields, London.

== Awards ==
- 2014: Commended, Casual Dining Awards, Hall & Woodhouse, Portished.
- 2013: English Heritage Pub of the Year, CAMRA, Hall & Woodhouse, Portished.

== See also ==
- List of Architecture Firms
- List of British architecture firms
