= Little Diversified Architectural Consulting =

American architecture company

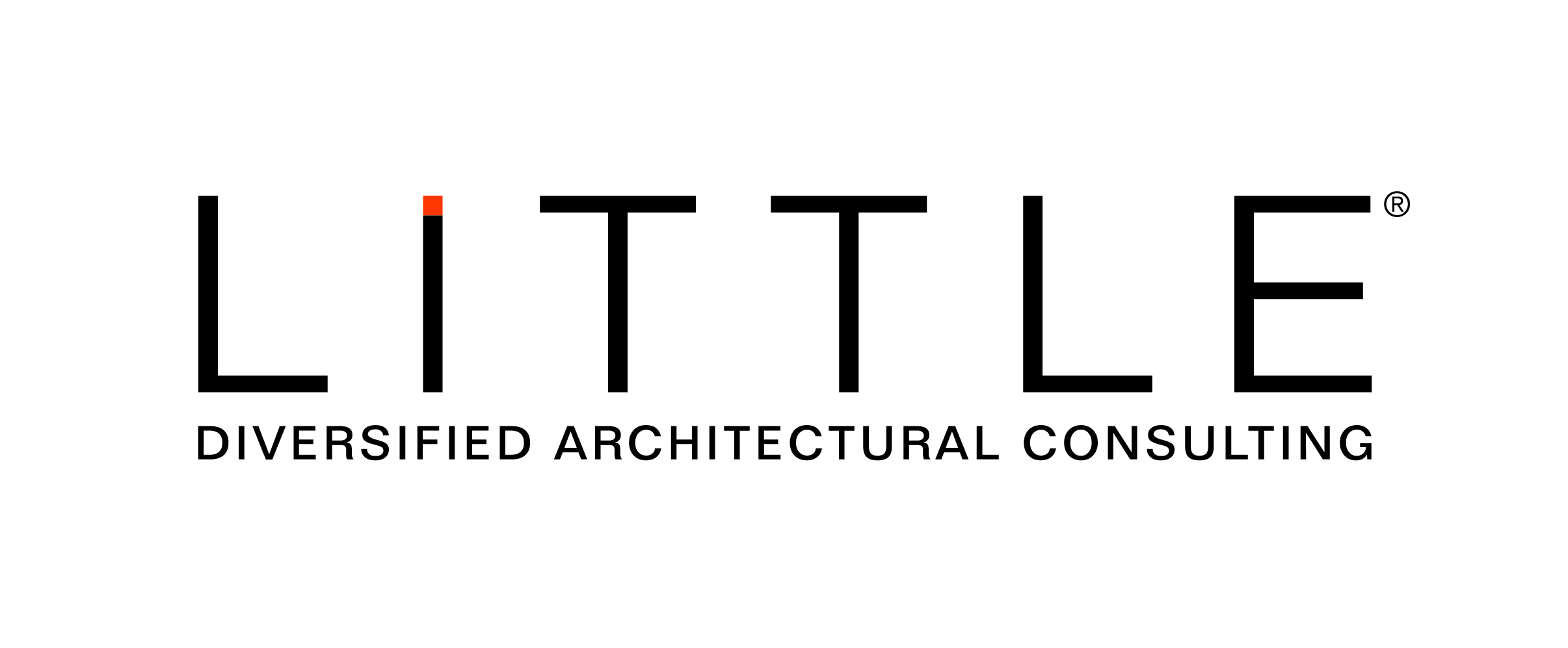
- Industry: Professional Services
- Founded: Charlotte, North Carolina, United States (1964)
- Founder: Bill Little
- Services: Architecture, Building Services/MEP Engineering, Graphics, Interior Design, Structural Engineering, Sustainable Design and Urban Design & Planning
- Website: www.littleonline.com

Little Diversified Architectural Consulting (Little) is an architecture and design firm offering services in architecture, interior architecture, engineering, land planning, facilities planning, space management, and 3D visualization. The firm provides design solutions for a range of sectors, incorporating sustainable and performance-based strategies.

== History ==
Little was founded by Bill Little in Charlotte, North Carolina, with a focus on user-centered design and its impact on people and organizations. This approach laid the foundation for the firm's growth, diversification, and client-focused philosophy.

Over the years, Little expanded by broadening leadership opportunities, integrating additional design disciplines, and introducing consulting services beyond traditional architecture. These efforts allowed the firm to work with a diverse range of clients and take on large-scale projects.

The firm has completed notable projects such as the Ally Charlotte Center and the Lowe’s Tech Hub. It is also involved in sustainable design initiatives, incorporating LEED and WELL certifications and avoiding materials listed on the Living Building Challenge (LBC) Red List. Today, Little is one of the largest architecture firms in the Carolinas.

== Sustainability and Innovation ==
Little incorporates regenerative design principles into its practice, with an emphasis on efficient resource use, environmental impact reduction, and social equity. The firm's approach includes collaboration with clients pursuing regenerative strategies aimed at enhancing environmental, economic, and community well-being. Its work in this area focuses on integrating measurable sustainability outcomes within the design process.

In 2024, Little was named a Top 100 Green Design Firms by Engineering News-Record, ranking #29 on the list.

== Recognition ==
- Triangle Business Journal, 2025 Largest Architecture Firms in North Carolina, #2
- Charlotte Business Journal, 2025 Largest Charlotte-Area Architecture Firm, #1
- Modern Healthcare, 2025 Top Architecture Firms, #16
- Interior Design, 2025 Top 100 Giants, #34
- Building Design + Construction, Top Architecture Design Firms, #25
- Engineering News-Record, 2024 Top 100 Green Design Firms, #29
- Interior Design, 2024 Top Retail Giants, #10
- VMSD 2023 Top Retail Design Firms, #11

== Awards ==
- CoreNet Global Innovator's Awards, 2023 Project of the Year 100,000 SF+ (Lowe's Tech Hub)
- Design Build Institute of America (DBIA) 2023 Southeast Award Winner (Mooresville Police Department)
- IIDA Florida Central Chapter IDEA Interior Design Excellence Awards, 2023 Sustainability Project (Little Orlando Office)
- AIA Charlotte, 2022 Honor Award, Unrealized Category (The Thread)
- USGBC Carolinas Green Gala, 2022 The People's Choice Award & Innovative Project- Health & Wellness Built Environment (Ally Charlotte Center)
- AIA Orange County, 2022 COTE Award & Award of Merit (NeoCity)
- Learning By Design Fall 2022 Architectural and Interior Design Awards of Excellence, Outstanding Project Award, (Ravenscroft School, The Olander Center for Student Life at the A.E. Finley Activity Center)
- CoreNet Carolinas Core Awards, 2022 Community Impact Award, (Veterans Bridge Home)
- AIA Orlando, 2022 Community Impact Award, (Tiny Green Home)
- American School & University Educational Interiors Showcase 2022, Outstanding Design, (Campbell University Oscar N. Harris Student Union)
- AIA Orange County Awards, 2021 Inspire Design Category Winner, (ReGenLA)

== Notable Projects ==
Project	Location	Year	Awards	Certifications
NASCAR Hall of Fame	Charlotte, North Carolina	2010	American Architecture Award Southeast Construction Best Architectural Design Award of Excellence	
Northeastern University - Charlotte Campus	Charlotte, North Carolina	2023	IIDA Carolinas DesignWorks Awards, Honorable Mention CoreNet Carolinas CORE Awards, Finalist	LEED Gold
4Roots - Regenerative Farm Campus	Orlando, Florida	2025	FEFPA Architectural Showcase Award of Merit AIA Charlotte Award AIA Orlando Award	Living Building Net Positive Carbon
The Heartest Yard - Congenital Heart Center	Charlotte, North Carolina	2020	IIDA Carolinas Design Works Awards - Honorable Mention	
Lowe's Global Tech Hub	Charlotte, North Carolina	2023	CoreNet Global Innovator's Award, Finalist - 2023 CoreNet Carolinas CORE Awards, Project of the Year >100k SF - 2023 IFMA Carolinas Innovation of the Year	
The Livery Stable	Tarpon Springs, Florida	2024	2023 Interior Design Excellence Awards (IIDA Florida Central Chapter), Project of the Year - Unbuilt category AIA Orlando Design Award	
The Parkline	Durham, North Carolina	2021	Rethinking the Future Award USGBC Climate Champion Award ASLA Southeast Regional Conference Merit	
The Thread	Rock Hill, South Carolina	2024	AIA Charlotte Honor Award 2022 AIA Charlotte Design Awards, Adaptive Reuse/Preservation, 2024	
Ally Charlotte Center	Charlotte, North Carolina	2021	Heavy Hitters CRE Award Winner IIDA Carolinas Design Works Award ENR Southeast Best Project Award of Merit	LEED Silver WELL Building Certified - Gold WiredScore Platinum Certified
NeoCity Academy High School	Kissimmee, Florida	2019	Leading By Design Citation of Excellence Award American School & University Outstanding Design USGBC Climate Champion Award	Pursuing LEED
