= Messana O'Rorke =

American architectural firm

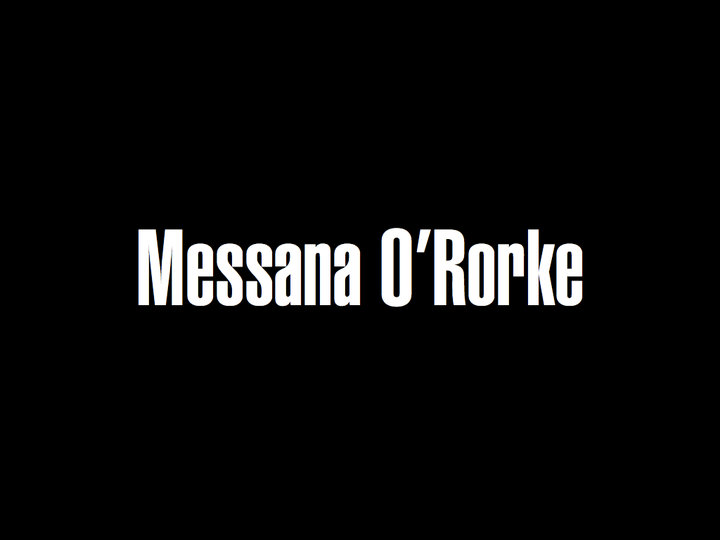
- Logo

Practice information
- Partners: Brian Messana, Toby O'Rorke
- Founded: 1996
- Location: New York City, United States

Messana O'Rorke is an American architecture and interior design firm founded by Brian Messana and Toby O'Rorke in 1996. The firm is recognized for their minimalist designs. Messana O'Rorke has earned design awards for their residential, commercial, mixed-use, hospitality and cultural projects.

== Partners ==
Toby O'Rorke earned a Bachelor of Arts degree from the School of Architecture at Oxford Polytechnic in 1985. After working with the Greater London Council Department of Architecture and apprenticing with architecture firms in Sydney, Australia, O'Rorke earned a postgraduate degree from Oxford Polytechnic and later attended postgraduate studies at Virginia Tech College of Architecture.

There, O'Rorke met California architect Brian Messana. Messana earned his master’s degree from Columbia Graduate School of Architecture, Planning and Preservation in New York in 1992. After graduation he worked for the architecture firms of Peter Marino Architect, Asymptote Architecture and Richard Meier & Partners.

In 1996, the pair formed Messana O'Rorke. The firm develops residential, commercial and institutional projects in the United States and abroad. The firm is recognized for its architecture of space, ideas and experience. Messana O'Rorke's designs are known for their use of minimalism. In 2019, the firm's Jewel Box, won the best of year award for Best Small Apartment.

== Projects ==
- Ten Broeck Cottage
- Malin + Goetz
- Charles Street Town House
- Hans Dorsinville Apartment
- Ramza Residence, Manhattan, New York
- Phoenix House
- Skin Care Lab
- Weinstein Loft
- Storefront Loft
- 200 E 62
- Jewel Box
- Junegrass House

== Awards ==
Year	Program	Award	Project
2013	Society of American Registered Architects	Design Award of Honor for the project	Isla de Vieques
2013	Society of American Registered Architects	Design Award of Honor for the project	Ten Broeck Cottage
2012	Society of American Registered Architects	Design Award of Honor for the project	Charles Street Town House
2011	Interior Design Magazine's Best Of Year 2011	Merit in category of Multistory Residence	Charles Street Town House
2009	Sunshine and Hope International Design Competition, China	Technical Excellence	Sunshine and Hope Elementary School
2006	Interior Design Magazine's Best Of The Best 2006	Residential Freestanding Projects	Ten Broeck Cottage
2006	Torre de Agua Exposition	Competition winning entry	Torre de Agua
2006	The American Institute of Architects New York City Chapter 2006 Design Awards	Award of Citation	StoreFront, New York, New York
2002	The American Institute of Architects New York State Chapter 2002 Design Awards	Award of Citation	Axis Theatre, New York, New York
2001	The American Institute of Architects New York Chapter 2001 Design Awards	Award for Interior Architecture	“Skin Care Lab.”
2001	The American Institute of Architects New York State Chapter 2001 Design Awards	Award of Merit	Skin Care Lab, New York, New York
1999	The American Institute of Architects New York Chapter 1999 Design Awards	Award for Interior Architecture	Axis Theatre, New York, New York
1998	Jyvaskyla Music and Arts Centre International Design Competition	First Runners up Group	Jyvaskyla Music and Arts Centre

== Exhibitions ==
- 2013 “The Phoenix House” Project 2013 Global Architecture Houses Exhibition, GA Gallery, Tokyo, Japan.
- 2009 “The Cube House” Project 2009 Global Architecture Houses Exhibition, GA Gallery, Tokyo, Japan.
- 2008 “The Wall House” Project 2008 Global Architecture Houses Exhibition, GA Galley, Tokyo, Japan.
- 2007 “The Box House” Project 2007 Global Architecture Houses Exhibition, GA Galley, Tokyo, Japan.
- 2006 StoreFront, New York City AIA Design Awards Exhibition, New York City AIA Center for Architecture, New York, USA
- 2006 Zaragoza 2008 Exposition, Water and the Sustainable Development of Cities, Proposal Exhibition, Zaragoza, Spain
- 2005 “Galahad House” Project 2005 Global Architecture Houses Exhibition, GA Gallery, Tokyo Japan
- 2004 Flight 93 National Memorial Competition Entrants Exhibition. Summerset, Pennsylvania, USA
- 2004 “Ten Broeck Cottage” Project 2004 Global Architecture Houses Exhibition, GA Gallery, Tokyo, Japan
- 2003 The World Trade Center International Memorial Competition Entrants Exhibition New York, New York.
- 2003 The High Line International Competition Entrants Exhibition @ Grad Central New York, New York
- 2003 Pearth Amboy High School Competition Entrants Exhibition, Pearth Amboy, New Jersey, USA
- 2003 “Island House” Project 2003 Global Architecture Houses Exhibition, GA Gallery, Tokyo, Japan
- 2002 Axis Theatre, Design Awards Exhibition, Arts Center New York, USA
- 2002 “Savage House” Project 2002 Global Architecture Houses Exhibition, GA Gallery, Tokyo, Japan
- 2001 Skin Care Lab, Design Awards Exhibition, Arts Center, New York USA
- 2001 “Apple Orchard House.” Project 2001. Global Architecture Houses Exhibition, GA Gallery, Tokyo, Japan
- 2000 “Fisherman’s House”, Project 2000. Global Architecture Houses Exhibition, GA Gallery, Tokyo, Japan
- 1999 Axis Theatre, Design Awards Exhibition, Arts Center New York, USA
- 1998 “ Angels Edge” Project 1998. Global Architecture Houses Exhibition, GA Gallery, Tokyo, Japan
- 1998 Jyvaskyla Music and Arts Centre. Competition Exhibition, Jyvaskyla, Finland.
- 1999 The American Institute of Architects New York Chapter 1999 Design Awards: Award for Interior Architecture for the project Axis Theatre, New York, New York.
- 1998 Jyvaskyla Music and Arts Centre International Design Competition: First Runners up Group: 1998.
