= Studio Saar =

British-Indian architecture practice

- Industry: Architecture and design
- Founder: Jonny Buckland and Ananya Singhal
- Headquarters: Udaipur, India and Frome, Somerset
- Website: www.studiosaar.design

Studio Saar is an architecture practice with offices in Udaipur in Rajasthan, India and Frome in Somerset, UK. The practice was founded by architects Jonny Buckland and Ananya Singhal, who previously worked for Allford Hall Monaghan Morris and Feilden Clegg Bradley Studios and BV Doshi respectively. Buckland and Singhal met while studying at the University of Bath in 2003.

== History ==
Studio Saar was founded by Buckland and Singhal in 2019 – the duo's first project together was extending a home in Hampshire. Third Space, a cultural centre in India, was their first major cultural project together. Studio Saar is connected to the electronics manufacturer Secure Metres – its parent company, as well as the not-for-profit called Dharohar, both of which are run by the Singhal family.

In 2022 the firm completed Secure Factory in Sanand, for Secure Metres. The site acts as a campus for staff and includes different zones for manufacturing, utilities, leisure and a canteen.

Secure Factory Sanand was designed and built during the COVID-19 pandemic and so features a selection passive and active ventilation to improve the site's safety. In 2022 it was highly commended in the Production, Energy and Recycling category at the World Architecture Festival awards.

In 2023 the practice completed its redevelopment of a community park in Udaipur, Rajasthan for Dharorar. Udaan Park was part of a larger local scheme of ‘green transformation’, to replace green spaces lost to increasing urbanisation. Locally sourced materials were repurposed for the park, which was planted with locally sourced plants.

Studio Saar worked with engineers Webb Yates and timber specialists Xylotek to create the Craft Not Carbon pavilion in London's Crystal Palace Park as part of the 2023 London Festival of Architecture. The pavilion was designed using lower carbon, durable materials.

Third Space, a major learning and cultural centre in Udaipur, India for Dharorar was completed in 2023, and named by Dezeen as the most significant building of that year.

In 2024 Studio Saar was part of the winning team for the annual Davidson Prize alongside Landstory, Stories, BAS, and Megaphone Creative. The scheme, the Apartment Store in Taunton, was praised by Rowan Moore.

Srivan, a lily-shaped reusable pavilion created by Studio Saar was unveiled at the inaugural Design Mumbai event in 2024.

In 2024 Dezeen named Studio Saar emerging practice of the year: judges described them as an ‘ambitious young practice [that] puts social and environmental sustainability at its core…the studio has delivered an impressive and diverse array of projects in the UK and India that belies its age.’

In 2025 Somerset council agreed to sell land in Frome for the Mayday Saxonvale scheme designed by a team that includes Studio Saar and described as the ‘UK’s largest community participative urban design and regeneration project’.

== Projects ==
Completed

- Secure Factory in Sanand – 2022
- Udaan Play Park – 2023
- Third Space – 2024

Design

- Apartment Store
- Mayday Saxonvale

== Awards ==
- Emerging architect of the year 2024 Dezeen
- The Davidson Prize 2024

== Exhibitions ==
- Craft Not Carbon pavilion, London Festival of Architecture 2023, with Webb Yates Engineers and Xylotek
- Srivan – Design Mumbai, 2024
- Craft Community Connection, Crafts Council gallery 2024
