= R.E. Chisholm Architects =

Architecture firm based in Miami, Florida

R. E. Chisholm Architects, Inc.

Practice information
- Key architects: Robert E. Chisholm FAIA; Chairman/CEO; Matthew Polak AIA, LEED AP; President of Architecture
- Founded: 1982
- Location: 782 NW 42nd Ave, Suite 650; Miami, Florida 33126; 305.661.2070

Website
- www.chisholmarchitects.com

R.E. Chisholm Architects, Inc. is a full-service architectural, interior design and urban design firm located in Miami, Florida. It was founded in 1982 by Robert E. Chisholm, FAIA. The firm is recognized locally and nationally for outstanding design and quality of service. Chisholm Architects provides services to clients throughout the United States, South and Central America, the Caribbean and Europe. Among the firm’s clients are corporate, municipal, state, and federal agencies, private clients, public and private institutions.

Robert E. Chisholm adopted the philosophy of working on a wide variety of projects, believing that this diversity of experience would develop the thinking and attitude of the architects, guiding them toward responsible leadership on each project. Chisholm Architects has designed numerous projects which include offices, restaurants, theaters, schools, university facilities, medical centers, commercial & retail sites, institutional & cultural centers, single and multi-unit residences, rapid transit stations, and aviation facilities. In 1992, the firm was named “Architectural Firm of the Year” in Miami-Dade County and again in 2019. In 1996, Robert E. Chisholm was named Fellow of the American Institute of Architects, the highest honor attainable in this 150-year-old organization, and in 2007, Mr. Chisholm was awarded the State of Florida AIA Silver Medal for Architecture.

== Projects ==
=== Commercial ===
- All Florida Paper Warehouse, Miami, Florida (2022)
- Hampton Inn Hotel Dadeland, Miami, Florida (2022)
- Coral Way Office Bldg., Miami, Florida (2022)
- GNP Animal Hospital, Miami, Florida (2021)
- UGAS Doral Gas Station, Doral, Florida (2020)
- MDCDTPW Trillium CNG Facility, Miami, Florida (2020)
- Arts District Development, Miami, Florida (2019)
- Classic Motors, Miami, Florida (2016)
- 1215 West Ave Miami Beach, Miami Beach, Florida (2012)
- Karisma Hotel & Resorts, Coral Gables, Florida (2012)
- Cuban Exile History Museum and Library, Miami, Florida (Design, 2012)
- Gables Waterway, Coral Gables, Florida (Design)
- Miller Branch for US Century Bank, Miami, Florida (2008)
- Tamarac Sports Complex, Tamarac, Florida (2008)
- Doral Branch and Executive HQ for US Century Bank, Doral, Florida (2007)
- Century Partners, Doral, Florida (2007)
- Capital Investments, Coral Gables, Florida (2006)
- Gables Waterway, Coral Gables, Florida (Design) (2005)
- Hapimag Hotel, Coral Gables, Florida (2001)
- Beachcomber Hotel, Miami Beach, Florida (1997)
- La Posse, Miami, Florida (1997)
- Los Ranchos Restaurants, Miami, Florida (1982-1992)

=== Institutional ===
- Miami Dade County Public Schools (Various), Miami, Florida
- University of Miami (Various), Coral Gables, Florida
- Sacred Heart Church New Building, Homestead, Florida (2024)
- Belen Jesuit Preparatory Baseball Stadium + Plaza, Miami, Florida (2022)
- Miami Dade College Homestead Campus, Bldg. F, Homestead, Florida (2020)
- Miami Dade College Kendall Campus, Data Center Bldg. 9000, Miami, Florida (2019)
- Miami Dade College Kendall Campus, Registrar’s Office Building R, Miami, Florida (2018)
- St. Augustine Catholic Church, Coral Gables, Florida (2010)
- St. Joseph’s Haitian Mission, Pompano Beach, Florida (2010)
- Our Lady of Guadalupe, Doral, Florida (2009)
- New World School of the Arts, Miami, Florida (2000)
- Community Partners for the Homeless II, Miami, Florida (1998)
- Community Partners for the Homeless I, Homestead, Florida (1995)
- St. Justin Martyr, Key Largo, Florida (1992)
- Everglades Farmworkers Village, Florida City, Florida (1991–Present)

=== Residential ===
- Castro Residence, Miami, Florida (2024)
- Fisher Island Residence Renovation, Miami, Florida (2024)
- Coral Gables Residence, Coral Gables, Florida (2022)
- JNJ Residence, Miami, Florida (2020)
- GM Residence, Miami, Florida (2015)
- Grove Estates, Miami, Florida (2015)
- Duplex Master Plan, Miami, Florida (2011)
- Cloisters at the Gables, Miami, Florida (2008)
- Everglades Farmworkers Village, Florida City, Florida (1991–Present)
- Faget Residence, Coral Gables, Florida (2003)
- Gables Waterway, Coral Gables, Florida (Design Stage)
- Mariners Cove, Key West, Florida (1994)
- Melrose Apartments, Miami, Florida (2010)
- Moreno Residence, Coral Gables, Florida (2007)
- The Oaks, Miami, Florida (2009)
- Our Lady of Guadalupe, Doral, Florida (2009)
- School House Road Luxury Residence, South Miami, Florida (2009)
- St. Monica, Miami Gardens, Florida (Design Stage)
- Suchman Residence, Coral Gables, Florida (1991)

== Recent Awards ==
- 2024 - Miami-Dade Favorites / Miami Herald – R.E. Chisholm Architects, Inc. was awarded Bronze Best Architecture Firm.
- 2022 - Mr. Chisholm was inducted into the American Institute of Architects / Miami Hall of Fame.
- 2022 - Philanthropist Award presented by the South FL Hispanic Chamber of Commerce in the Hispanic Leadership Awards.
- 2020 - US Green Building Council – Innovative Project of the Year finalist: New Construction – Public Assembly, Father Gerard Jean Juste Oak Grove Park Community Center.
- 2019 - Architectural Firm of the Year. Greater Miami Chamber of Commerce: Real Estate Achievers & Leaders Award.
- 2016 - Architect and Architect Firm of the year, South FL Hispanic Chamber of Commerce to Mr. Chisholm and R.E. Chisholm Architects, Inc.
- 2010 - Community Partnership for Homeless, Inc. The Robert E. Chisholm, FAIA Service Award.
- 2008 - Ronald McDonald House Twelve Good Men Award for Outstanding Community Service and Involvement to Robert E. Chisholm, FAIA, NCARB.
- 2007 - Florida & Caribbean Association of the American Institute of Architects, Silver Medal Award for Architecture to Robert E. Chisholm, FAIA, NCARB
- 2007 - Greater Miami Chamber of Commerce, Top 100 Minority Business Awards, R.E. Chisholm Architects, Inc.
- 2006 - March of Dimes Community Excellence Award – Architectural and Engineering – Robert E. Chisholm, FAIA, NCARB
- 2006 - Alvah H. Chapman Jr. Humanitarian, Award to Robert E. Chisholm, FAIA, NCARB
- 2005 - Miami/American Institute of Architects, Silver Medal Award Government Service Award - Robert E. Chisholm, FAIA, NCARB
- 2004 - American Institute of Architects, Charles W. Clary Government Service Award
- 2004 - Miami-Dade College Hall of Fame/Architecture to Robert E. Chisholm, FAIA, NCARB
- 2002 - Historic Preservation Award, Dade Heritage Trust, Cuchiella Residence Homestead, Florida
