= Consolidated Consultants =

Consolidated Consultants Group (CCG)
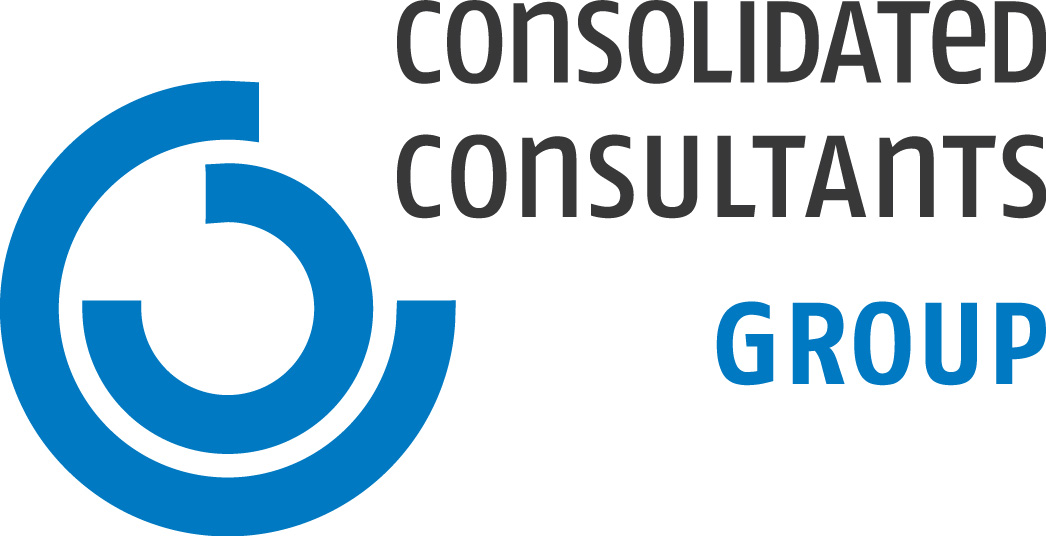
- Type: Private
- Founded: Early 1960s, re-structured in 1993
- Headquarters: Amman, Jordan
- Number of locations: Amman, Aqaba, Ramallah, Beirut, Abu Dhabi, Dubai, Ras Al Khaimah, Baghdad, Erbil, Sulaymaniyah, Muscat, Riyadh, Doha, Sana'a, Tripoli, Astana, Tbilisi, Luanda, Delaware
- Area served: Worldwide
- Number of employees: 600+
- Website: www.group-cc.com

Consolidated Consultants Group (CCG) is an international architectural and engineering consultancy firm, specialized in the provision of studies, planning, design and management services in architecture, buildings, infrastructure, transportation, roads, bridges, water and waste water, dams, hydrological analysis and hydraulic structures, with over 600 staff operating in more than 25 countries.

== History ==
The firm has been operating in the field of engineering services since the 1960s. The company was restructured in 1993 by consolidating some of the major Jordanian consultancy firms and a number of outstanding individuals. The firm acquired the prestigious architecture consulting firm "Jafar Tukan and Partners, a firm that had led the development of architecture in Jordan for three decades.

== Awards and recognition ==
- 1998 - Award of Excellence by the late King Hussein of Jordan for the design & supervision of construction of Karameh Dam
- 1999 - Award of Merit from the Association of Civil Engineers of New Zealand for the Design & Supervision of construction of Wadi Hadada Tunnel in downtown Amman
- 2001- Architect Jafar Tukan, Chairman of Consolidated Consultants, was awarded the Palestine Award for Architecture
- 1982 & 2002- Jafar Tukan was also awarded two Organization of Arab Cities awards
- 2003- Best Consultancy Award by the Ministry of Public Works and Housing (MPWH) of Jordan for Dead Sea – Ma'in Project (Roads Specialty)
- 2004- ACEC Engineering Excellence Award by the American Council of Engineering Companies for the Aqaba Industrial Zone Project
- 2007- Best Consultancy Award by the Ministry of Public Works and Housing (MPWH) of Jordan for ESIA for DISI Water Conveyance System Project (Specialized Engineering)
- 2009- Best Executed Project Award by Greater Amman Municipality (GAM)
- 2011- CKing Abdullah Award for Excellence (Private Sector)
- 2011- Consultancy Award by the Ministry of Public Works and Housing of Jordan for Embassy of the Kingdom of the Netherlands Project (Buildings Specialty)
- 2011- Best Consultancy Award by the Ministry of Public Works and Housing of Jordan for Prince Hussein Bin Abdullah II Intersection Project (Roads Specialty)

== Notable projects ==
- Jabal Omar Development Project, Zones S1 & S2, KSA
- Shams Al Riyadh Residential Committee, KSA
- Al Batinah Coastal Highway | Oman
- Bereket- Etrek- Turkmenistan- Iran Board Railway, Turkmenistan
- KINAXX Housing Project -20,000 apartments, Angola
- Ersal Master Plan, Palestine
- Metelong Dam, Lesotho
- Al-Kufra - Jabel Ewinat - Nile River Road, Libya & Sudan
- Jordan Gate Towers, Jordan
- Amman Development Corridor, Jordan
- Abu Dhabi Medium and Small Court Houses, UAE
- Al Gira Development Project (2000 Housing Units), Libya
- Yaser Arafat Memorial Museum, Palestine
- Al Najah National University, Palestine
- Mahmmoud Darwish Memorial Park, Palestine
- Jordan University of Science and Technology, Jordan
- National Library of Jordan, Jordan (Best Executed Project Award 2009)
- QIPCO Twin Towers, Qatar
- Hajj Oasis (Pilgrim City), Jordan
- Sewer and Storm Water Master Plan for Kirkuk, Iraq
- Aqaba New Shallaleh Neighborhood (1100 Housing Units),' Jordan (Arab Council of Ministers of Housing and Reconstruction 2007 Award)
- Prince Hussein Bin Abdullah II Intersection, Jordan (Best Consultancy Award 2011 - Road Specialty)
- Karameh Dam, Jordan (Al Hussein Medal for Distinguished Performance of the First Order)
- ESIA for Disi Water Conveyance System Project, Jordan (Best Consultancy Award 2007 - Specialized Engineering)
- Dead Sea Main Road, Jordan (Best Consultancy Award 2003 - Road Specialty)
- Aqaba Industrial Zone Project, Jordan (ACEC Engineering Excellence Award)
- Wadi Hadada Tunnel in downtown Amman, Jordan (Award of MERIT)
