= A69 Architects =

Architecture studio in Prague

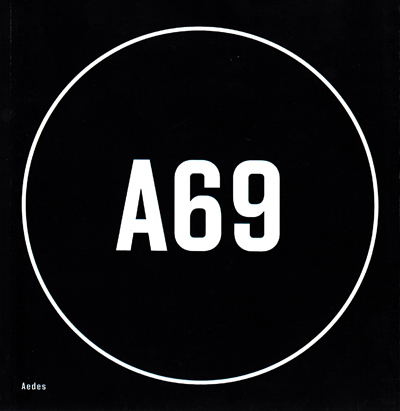
- Trade name: A69 Architects
- Company type: Private
- Industry: Architecture & Planning
- Founded: 1994 (under the name Atelier 69 - Architekti) | 2003 (under the name A69 - architekt s.r.o)
- Founder: Boris Redčenkov & Prokop Tomášek
- Headquarters: Prague, Czech Republic
- Number of employees: 12
- Website: https://www.a69.cz

A69 Architects is an architecture studio in Prague-Braník, Czech Republic. It was founded in 1994 in Cheb by Boris Redčenkov and Prokop Tomášek as the association Atelier 69 – architects, since 2003 as A69 – architects. The studio is doing design work on one-family houses with characteristic features as well as urban planning.

== History ==
In 1994, Boris Redčenkov and Prokop Tomášek founded Atelier 69 – Architects. Later in 1997 Jaroslav Wertig became a partner to the Atelier. Today the atelier is known as A69 – architects s.r.o. The studio first started in Cheb.

== Projects ==
=== On-going projects ===
- Florenc Bus Station Competition (Prague)

In the spring of 2021, UNIT architects, A69 architects and the London studio Marko & Placemakers won the competition for the design of the bus station in Prague's surroundings and its surroundings. "The winning design won us over for its urban solution with a reasonable scale and the design of the connection between Těšnov and Žižkov with a new public space at the foot of Žižkov. In addition, it addresses the possibility of a future relocation of the main road in the Těšnov area, which gives the opportunity to create a new city park.

- Smíchov City Design (Prague)

The Smichov City design started in 2020 with the development of the first phase- the northern stage- which is building 15,000m^{2} of offices, restaurant, market, and shopping spaces, as well as apartments.

=== Past projects ===
- Reconstruction of a family house (Stará Boleslav), 2020
- Extension of the Sanatorium Dr. Peták (Františkovy Lázně), 2006
- EggO House (Prague, Czech Republic), 2006
- Villa Lea (Slatina), 2005
- House – Plot (Cheb), 2004
- Sanitorium Dr. Peták (Františkovy Lázně), 2001

== Awards ==
- '17 BigMat Home of Builders, International Architecture Award. The Prototype of the House in Posazavi.
