= Afrikaanse Hoër Meisieskool =

Coordinates: 25°45′21″S 28°13′13″E

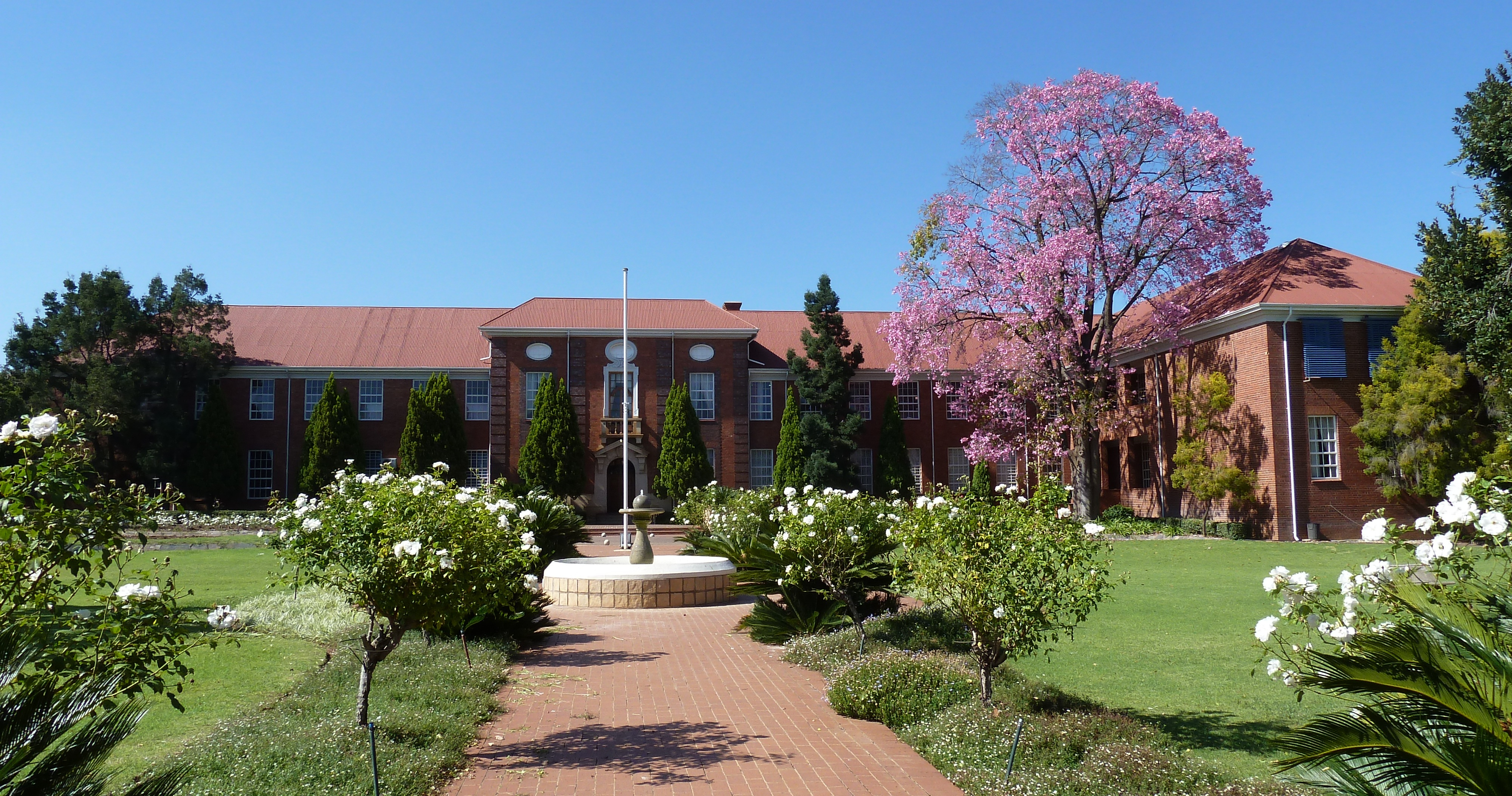
- Afrikaanse Hoër Meisieskool Main building

Location
- 43 Bond Street, Clydesdale; Pretoria, Gauteng; South Africa

Information
- School type: All-girls public school
- Motto: Ek sien haar wen
- Religious affiliation: Christianity
- Established: 28 January 1920; 106 years ago
- Founder: Jan Joubert and Chris Neethling
- Sister school: Afrikaanse Hoër Seunskool
- Grades: 8 to 12
- Age: 14 to 18
- Language: Afrikaans
- Colours: Blue white
- Nickname: Meisies Hoër
- Rivals: Sekondêre Meisieskool Oranje en Menlo
- Accreditation: Gauteng Department of Education
- Newspaper: Stroom Op
- Website: www.ahmp.co.za

Afrikaanse Hoër Meisieskool Pretoria (Colloquially known as Meisies Hoër) is a public, Afrikaans medium high school for girls in the suburb of Clydesdale in Pretoria in the Gauteng province of South Africa. It is the sister school of the Afrikaanse Hoër Seunskool .

== History ==
The Afrikaans Hogere Skool was established on 28 January 1920, in the house of General PJ Joubert. The address was 218 Visagie Street, Pretoria. It was considered as a rebel school because it was the first Afrikaans-language secondary school. Afrikaans was not an official language in South Africa then. The school opened its doors for boys and girls. A new school building was inaugurated on 26 January 1927 and in 1930, separate schools for girls and boys, Afrikaanse Hoër Meisieskool and Afrikaanse Hoër Seunskool respectively, were established. The school's motto, "Ek sien haar wen", is derived from Jan F.E. Celliers's poem "By die vrouebetoging".

=== Recent history ===
In 2003, the school won first place in the annual Afrikaans Olympiad in the language category, ahead of Potchefstroom Gimnasium in North West and Bloemhof High School in Western Cape.

== Notable alumni ==
- Sheila Cussons (1938) Studied engraving further in Amsterdam. In 1992, she was awarded an Honorary Doctorate for her contributions to Afrikaans by the University of KwaZulu-Natal.
- Sandra Prinsloo (Class of 1965) South African actress
- Vanes-Mari du Toit (Class of 2007) South African professional netball player.
- Reine Swart (Class of 2008) South African actress and filmmaker.
- Izette Griesel (Class of 2010) South African professional netball player.
