= Jack A. Charney =

American architect

Jack Allen Charney (born 7 October 1919 - 2002) was an American mid-century architect who designed a number of significant buildings in various cities across California, including Los Angeles, Beverly Hills, San Francisco and Long Beach. His designs include the 32-story Sierra Towers in West Hollywood, from 1965.

== Life and career ==
Charney was born in San Francisco, California. While working as a licensed general contractor, Charney attended the Art Center School where he studied architecture under Rudolph Schindler and Richard Neutra.

By February 1955 Charney had won the construction contract for the second rebuilding of landmark Hollywood restaurant Perino's, at 4101 Wilshire. The architect was Charney's sometime collaborator Alfred March. Charney later opened his own solo firm, Jack Allen Charney AIA Associates, based in Los Angeles, California,

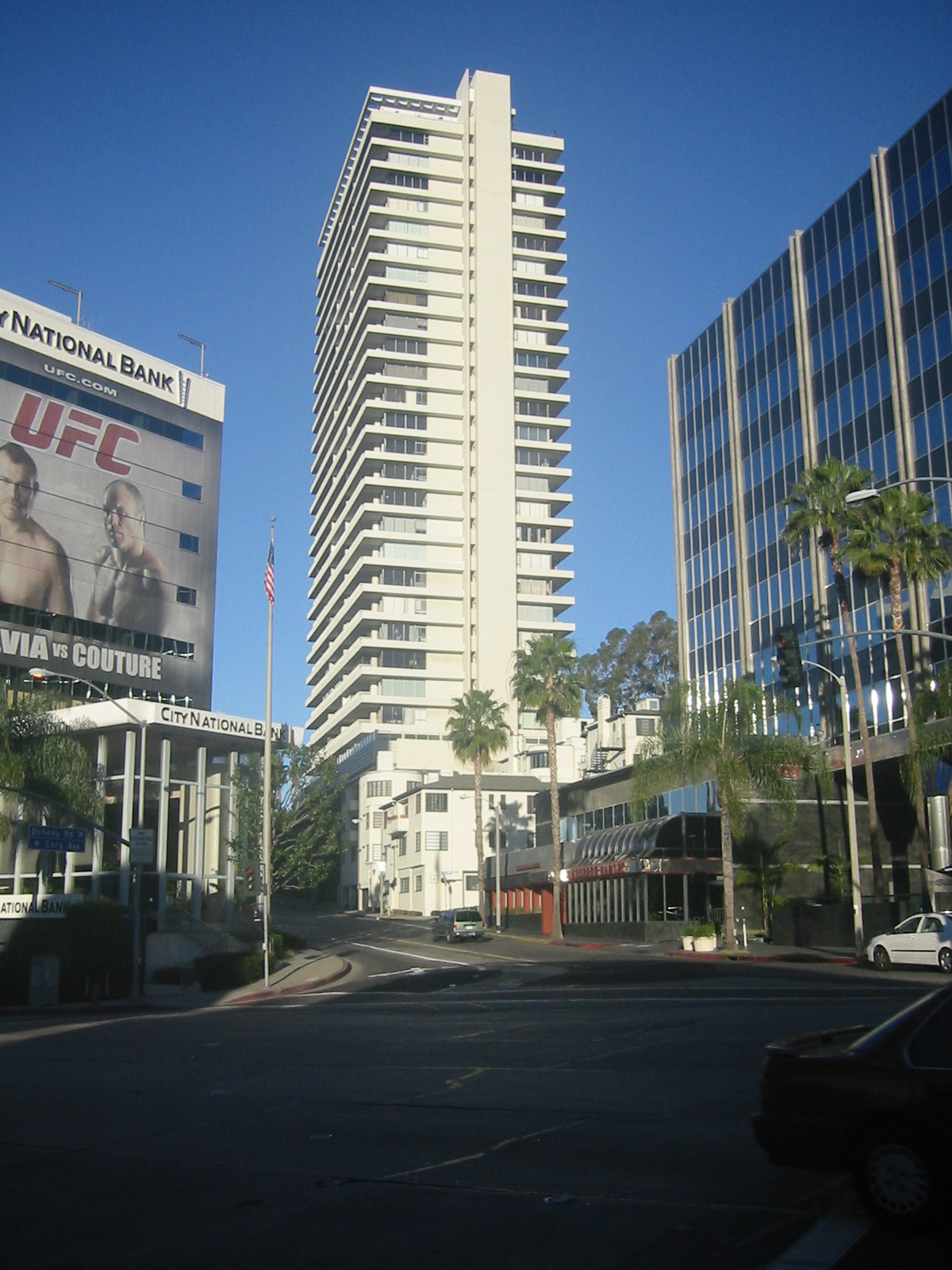
Sierra Towers, West Hollywood, 1965

Like his mentor Neutra, in residential designs Charney was known for an open-concept plan, with indoor/outdoor living areas, sliding glass door walls and light-filled rooms. It was Charney's philosophy "to take maximum advantage of views of city, mountains and ocean".

In his public buildings, Charney was known for impressive, mid-century architectural conceptual designs for apartment complexes, commercial and office buildings, and restaurants across southern California—in Los Angeles, Beverly Hills, San Diego and Long Beach. His largest single project was the Sierra Towers at 9255 Doheny Road in West Hollywood, which remains a prestigious address, the tallest building for miles, condo units held by an array of celebrities, and an appearances in Grand Theft Auto Online as Eclipse Towers.

Charney died in Los Angeles County in 2002, at 82.

== Buildings ==
- San Francisco Redevelopment Authority Diamond Heights Housing Project #3, Diamond Heights, San Francisco, with landscape architects Eckbo, Dean & Williams, 1963
- Sierra Towers, West Hollywood, California, 1965
- Pacifica Hospital, Los Angeles
- 9445 Duxbury Road, Beverlywood, Los Angeles (Demolished 2021)

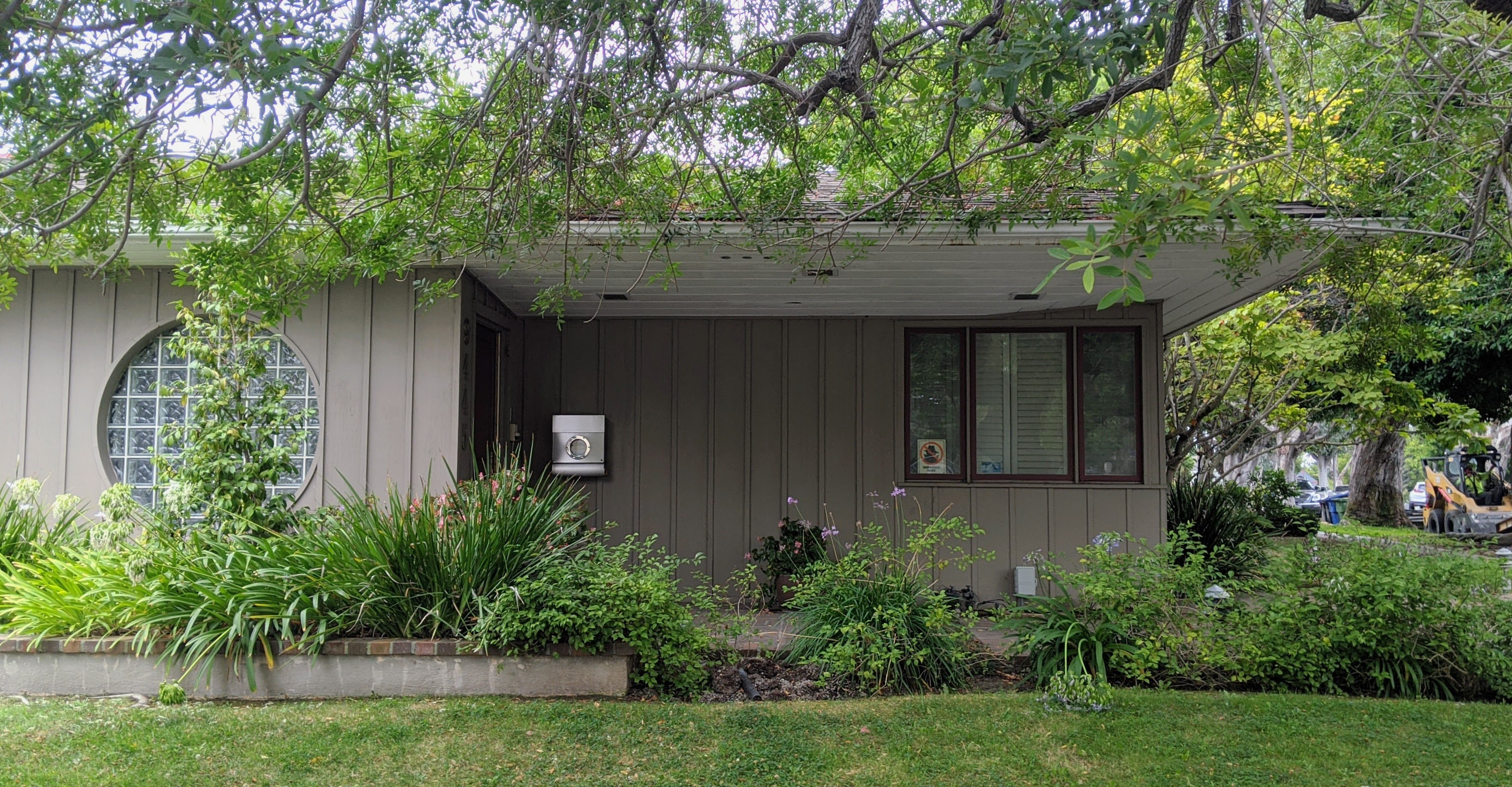
View of 9445 Duxbury Road from S Beverly Drive.
