= T Sakhi =

Lebanese architecture and design studio

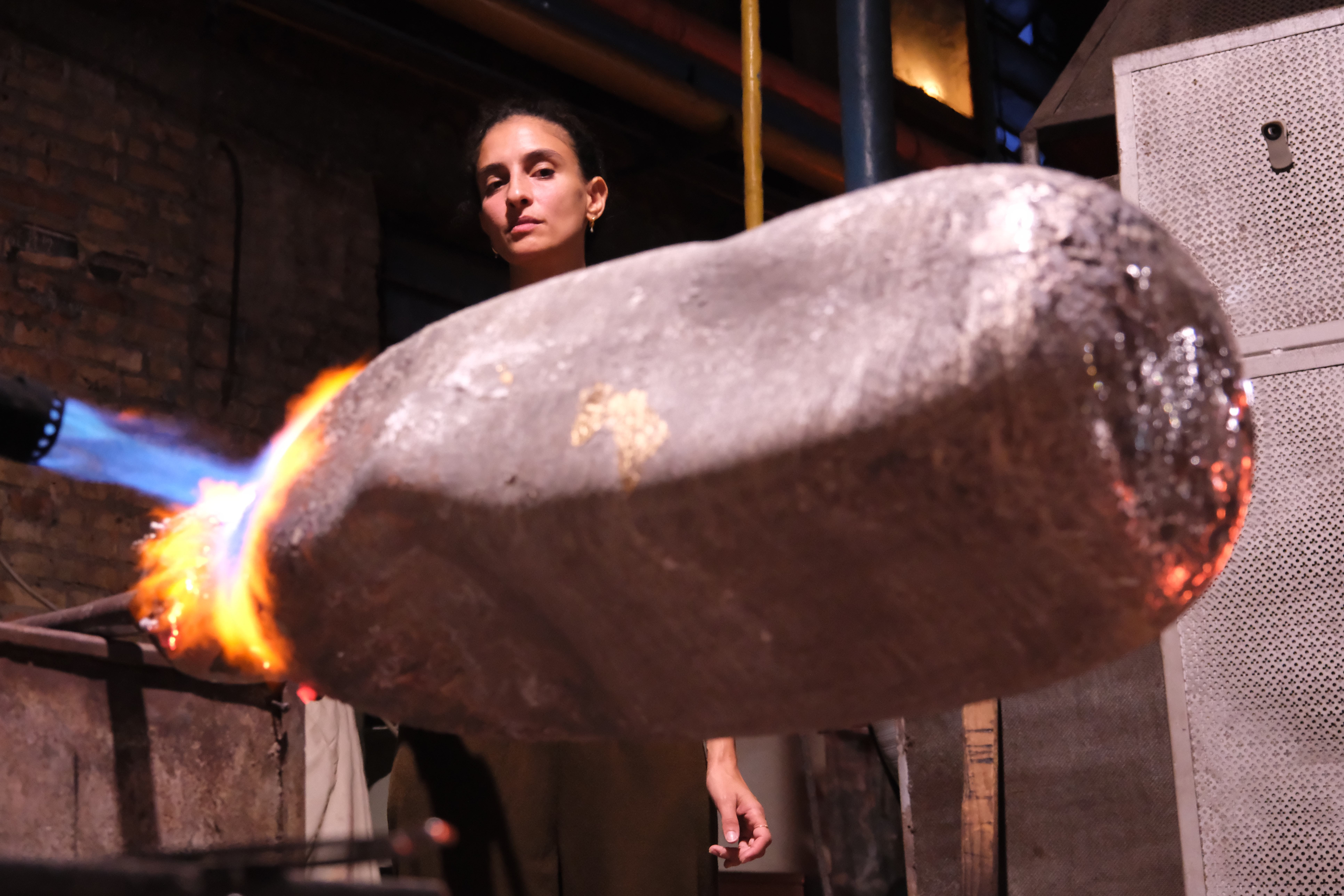
Tara Sakhi

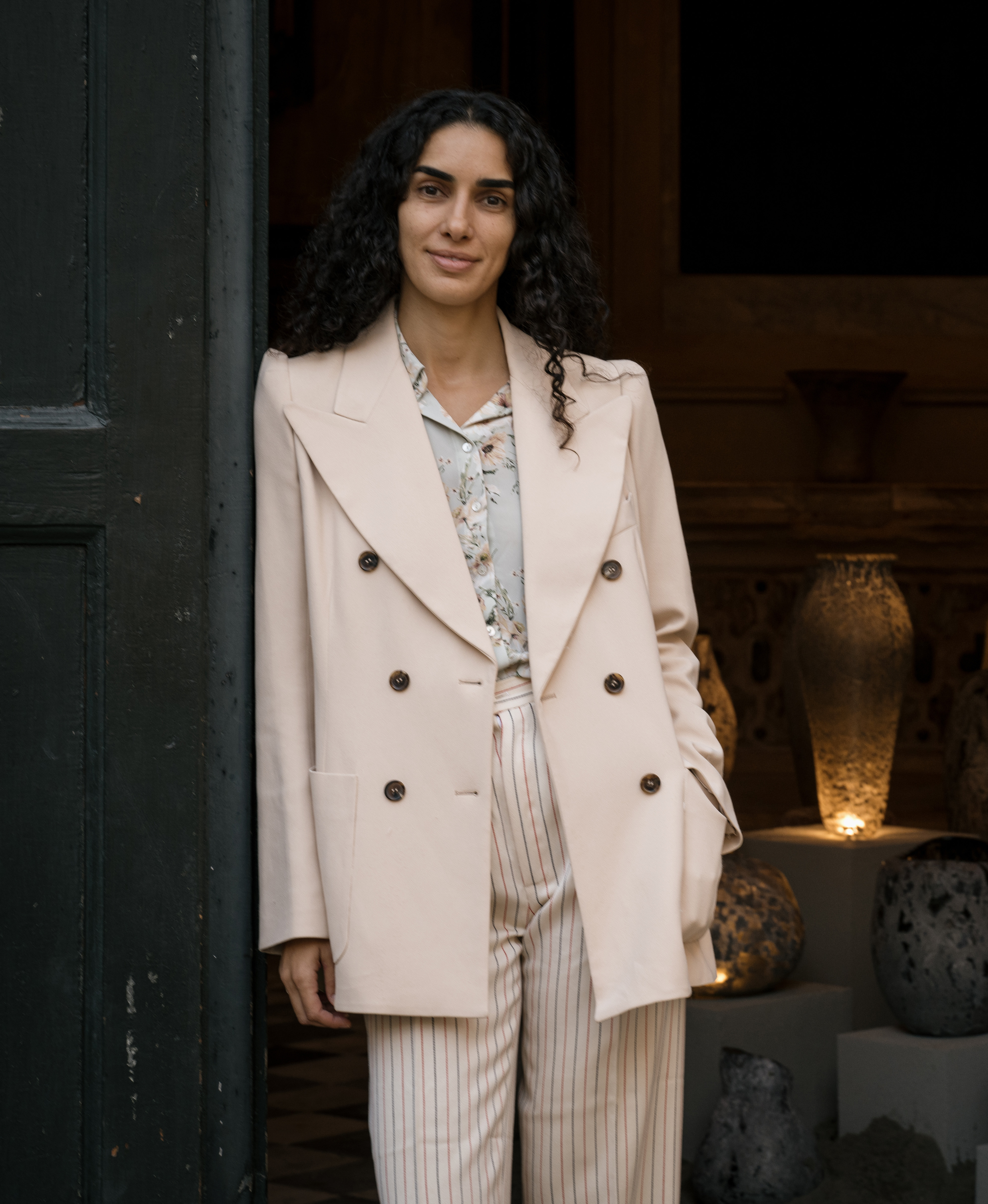
Tessa Sakhi

T Sakhi is a Lebanese architecture and design studio founded in 2016 by sisters Tara and Tessa Sakhi.

== Background ==
Sisters Tessa and Tara Sakhi founded the architecture and design studio in Lebanon in 2016, after completing their architecture studies. The sisters initially worked on decorating their own home, and then moved on to interior design projects and various projects including nightclubs, a pub, and a festival.

The sisters' mother is of a Polish background and their father is of a Lebanese background. They grew up in Beirut, Lebanon's capital. They have spoken about how their upbringing in a city with "occidental and Arabic historical affluences" has impacted their creative work. At the time of the 2020 explosion in the city, Tessa was living in a home 4 kilometres (2.5 mi) from the site of the explosion; she described the damage caused by the explosion as "beyond an apocalypse".

== Work and reception ==
Arab News described their 2019 project "ADAR", a "reimagining of a Levantine restaurant in Paris", as a "beautifully whimsical take on the Middle East's textures and tones, that never lapsed into cliché." Dezeen magazine in 2019 highlighted two "public intervention" projects by their studio that provided seating within the urban environment of Beirut, one of which involved obtaining permission to convert damaged Czech hedgehogs, a type of anti-tank obstacle, into stools. They hosted the Lebanon Pavilion during Dubai Design Week in 2019 where they presented their exhibition "WAL(L)TZ".

Their 2021 public installation in Venice, "Letters from Beirut", was held at the same time as Venice Biennale of Architecture but not under any of the official Biennale pavilions. They used their website to invite Lebanese people to send letters containing their experiences to be displayed in the exhibition. The studio was also listed as one of the Top 50 Product Designers by Architectural Digest Middle East in 2021.

Tessa Sakhi released a nature-inspired perfume collection in 2022. The sisters received the Special Recognition Prize from Fondazione di Venezia and the Italian and Venice Glass Weeks for their work "I Hear You Tremble" that year.
