= Metron (company) =

Swiss architecture and planning firm

- Industry: Architecture and planning
- Founded: 1965
- Headquarters: Brugg, Switzerland
- Services: Architecture; spatial development; transport; landscape; environment
- Owner: Employees (majority, through a foundation)
- Number of employees: About 160 (2025)
- Website: metron.ch

Metron is a Swiss architecture and planning services company based in Brugg. It was formed in 1965 from the merger of planning and architecture offices in Brugg and works across architecture, spatial development, transport, landscape, and the environment. Through a foundation, its employees hold a majority stake in the holding company Metron AG.

== History ==
Metron was formed in 1965 from the merger of planning and architecture offices in Brugg. Its aim is to create holistic approaches to the design of living spaces suited to people and the environment through interdisciplinary cooperation between architecture, spatial development, transport, landscape, and the environment. In its first years the focus was mainly on social questions, such as the architecture of housing estates and forms of self-management. Later, ecological considerations such as optimal land use, the use of renewable energy, and new building materials became increasingly important.

Metron made a name for itself with residential, commercial, industrial, and service buildings, above all in the cantons of Aargau and Zurich, and with the conversion of old industrial and commercial buildings. Its ecological and simple building method gave important impetus to housing construction.

Through a foundation, the employees hold a majority stake in Metron AG, which has been organized as a holding company since 1974 and holds six joint-stock companies. In addition to the head office in Brugg, there have been branch offices in Zurich and Bern since 1996. In 2007 the Metron group had about 120 employees in 30 professions.

== Bibliography ==
- I. Rucki, D. Huber (eds.), Architektenlexikon der Schweiz 19./20. Jahrhundert, 1998, 374
- Metron: Planen und Bauen 1965–2003, exhibition catalog, Zurich, 2003
