= Baumschlager-Eberle =

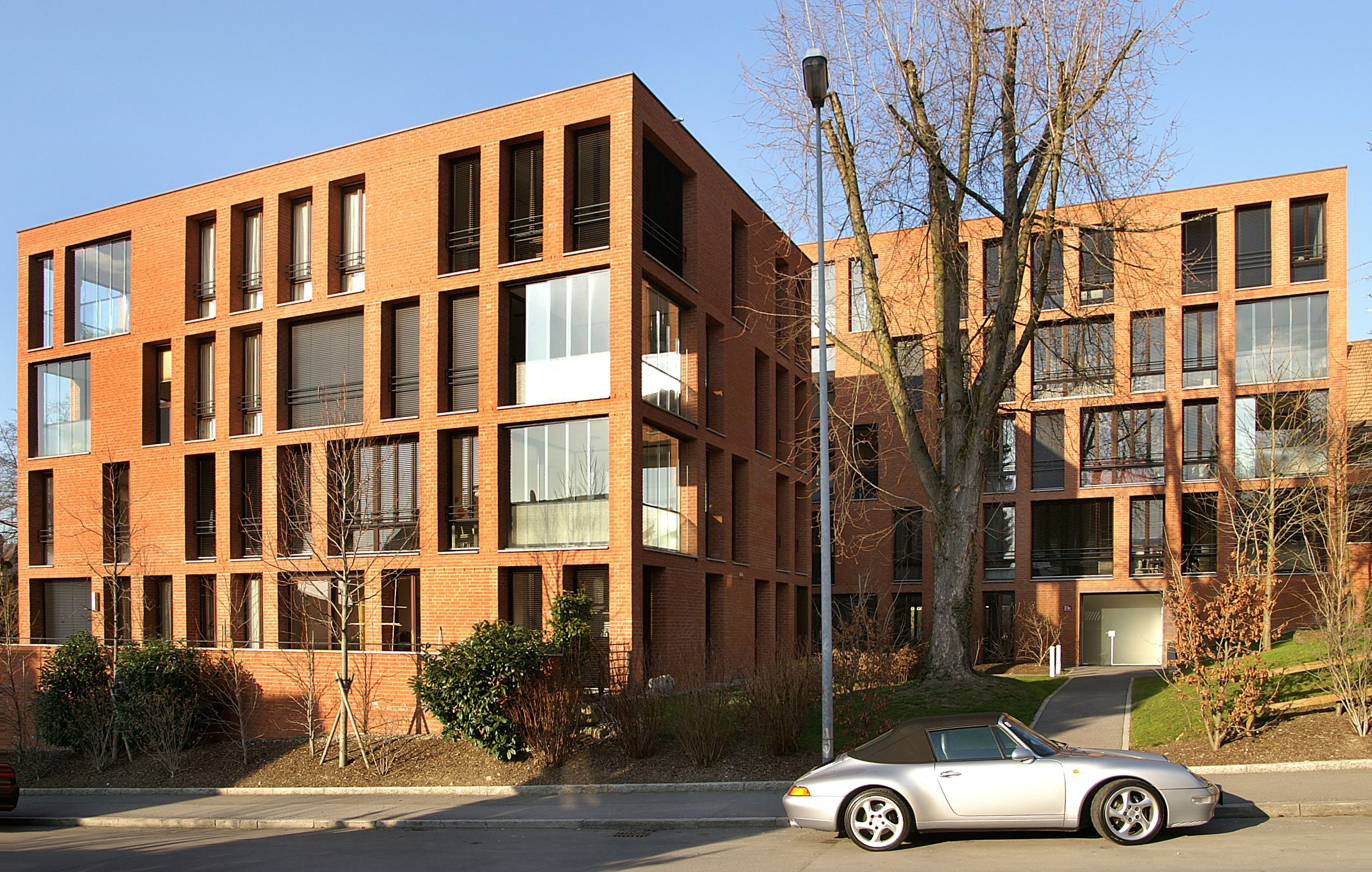
Apartments in Rosenstrasse, Dornbirn, 2003

Baumschlager-Eberle is a partnership of architects in Austria.

== History ==
Since its founding in 1985 the firm of Carlo Baumschlager and Dietmar Eberle, Architects, has carried out more than 300 building projects. Recent major projects include the Vienna International Airport extension, a large-scale hospital building in the Belgian town of Courtrai (Kortrijk), high-rises in Beijing and the UNAIDS/WHO building in Geneva.

Since starting up business in Vorarlberg, the westernmost state of Austria, with the focus of its activities on housing and residential architecture, the company has meanwhile become internationally established with branches in Lochau (Austria), Vienna, St. Gallen (Switzerland), Zürich (Switzerland), Vaduz (Liechtenstein) and Beijing.

Professor Winfried Nerdinger attributes the success of the practice to "the combination of a clearly evident maintenance of architectural tradition, the use of the most modern technologies, and a concern for sustainable energy efficiency".

== Founders ==
Carlo Baumschlager, born 1956, began his lecturing activities in early 2007. He is a professor at the Munich Academy of Fine Arts.

Dietmar Eberle, born 1952, lectures at the Swiss Federal Institute of Technology in Zürich. His latest publication “Von der Stadt zum Haus” (“From the Town to the House”) (2007) reflects the results of a course he held at the Technology Institute.

== Notable projects ==
- Vienna International Airport Skylink, Austria (2005)
- Moma Apartments, Beijing, China (2005)
- ETH e-science Lab, HIT Building, Zürich, Switzerland (2008)

=== In progress ===
- University La cité des sciences in Belval, Luxembourg (2013)
- Hospital in Kortrijk, Belgium (2018)

== Sources ==
- Winfried Nerdinger (ed.), Baumschlager-Eberle 2002-2007 - Architecture - People and Resources, Springer Verlag, Vienna (2007), ISBN 978-3-211-71470-6
