= Hudson Architects =

British architectural firm

Hudson Architects are a British architecture practice based in Norwich, London and Holt, UK.

Hudson Architects have completed buildings in a number of different sectors. Projects include Bavent House, which won a Royal Institute of British Architects (RIBA) Award in 2011, and the Salvation Army Citadel in Chelmsford, which won a RIBA Award in 2010. The practice has also designed Feeringbury Barn – a large converted 16th century barn in Essex, and the OPEN Youth Venue in Norwich.
