= List of defunct automated train systems =

List of defunct automated train systems of automation grades from GoA1 to GoA4.

Country/region	Name of system	Date	System	Notes
Canada	Expo Express	1967–1972	Union Switch & Signal	(Note: Demonstration line originally built for the 1967 World's Fair.)
Canada	Line 3 Scarborough	1985–2023		4 mile driverless light rapid transit line that served as part of the Toronto subway
France	Poma 2000	1989–2016		
France	MP 51	1952–1956	ATO "mat"	770m shuttle service, rubber-tyred metro
Germany	Berlin M-Bahn	1989–1991		(Note: Maglev train in West-Berlin in operation from 1989 to 1991. It closed when a metro line, on which the M-Bahn's route partly lay, was scheduled to reopen. The metro line was closed in 1961 when the Berlin Wall erected, because it crossed the border.)
Japan	Narita Airport Terminal 2 Shuttle System	1992–2013	Otis Hovair	(Note: Driverless shuttle connecting two buildings of Narita Airport Terminal 2.)
Spain	Former Barcelona Line 2 metro (now Line 5)	1961–1970	Photoelectric cells	
Portugal	SATUOeiras	2004–2015	MiniMetro	
United Kingdom	Birmingham Maglev	1984–1995		
United Kingdom	Post Office Railway	1927–2003		(Note: Tiny, driverless, mail-only subway connecting main post offices and railway terminals in London.)
United States	Duke University Medical Center Patient Rapid Transit	1979–2009	Otis Hovair	
United States	Harbour Island People Mover	1985-1999	Otis Hovair	
United States	Indiana University Health People Mover	2003–2019	UniTrak	
United States	Jetrail	1970–1974		
United States	Muskingum Electric Railroad	1968–2002		(Note: Private electrified automated coal carrying railroad. Dismantled in 2004.)
United States	Vought Airtrans	1974–2005		
