= MiniMetro =

Automated people mover

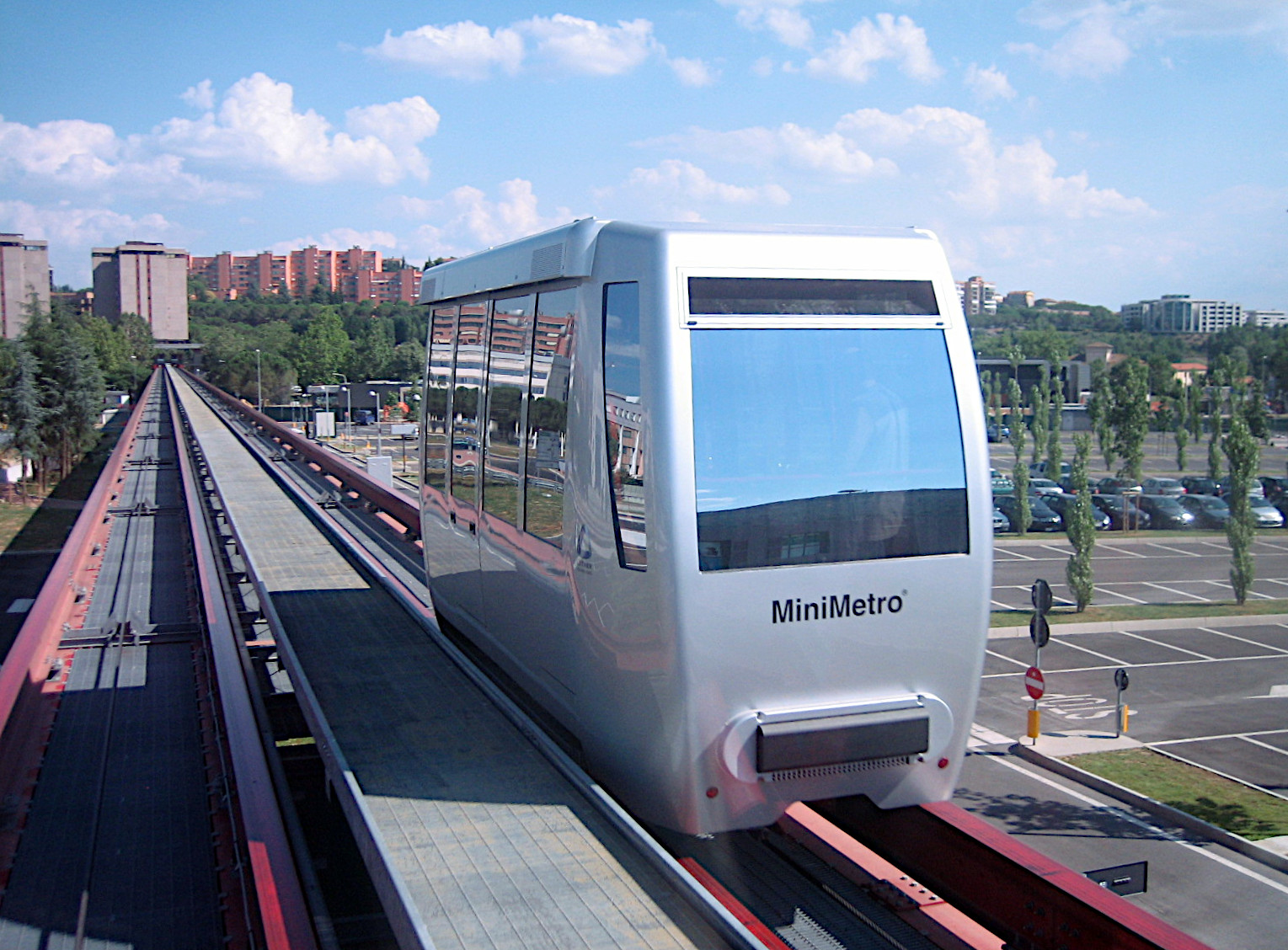
Minimetrò Perugia

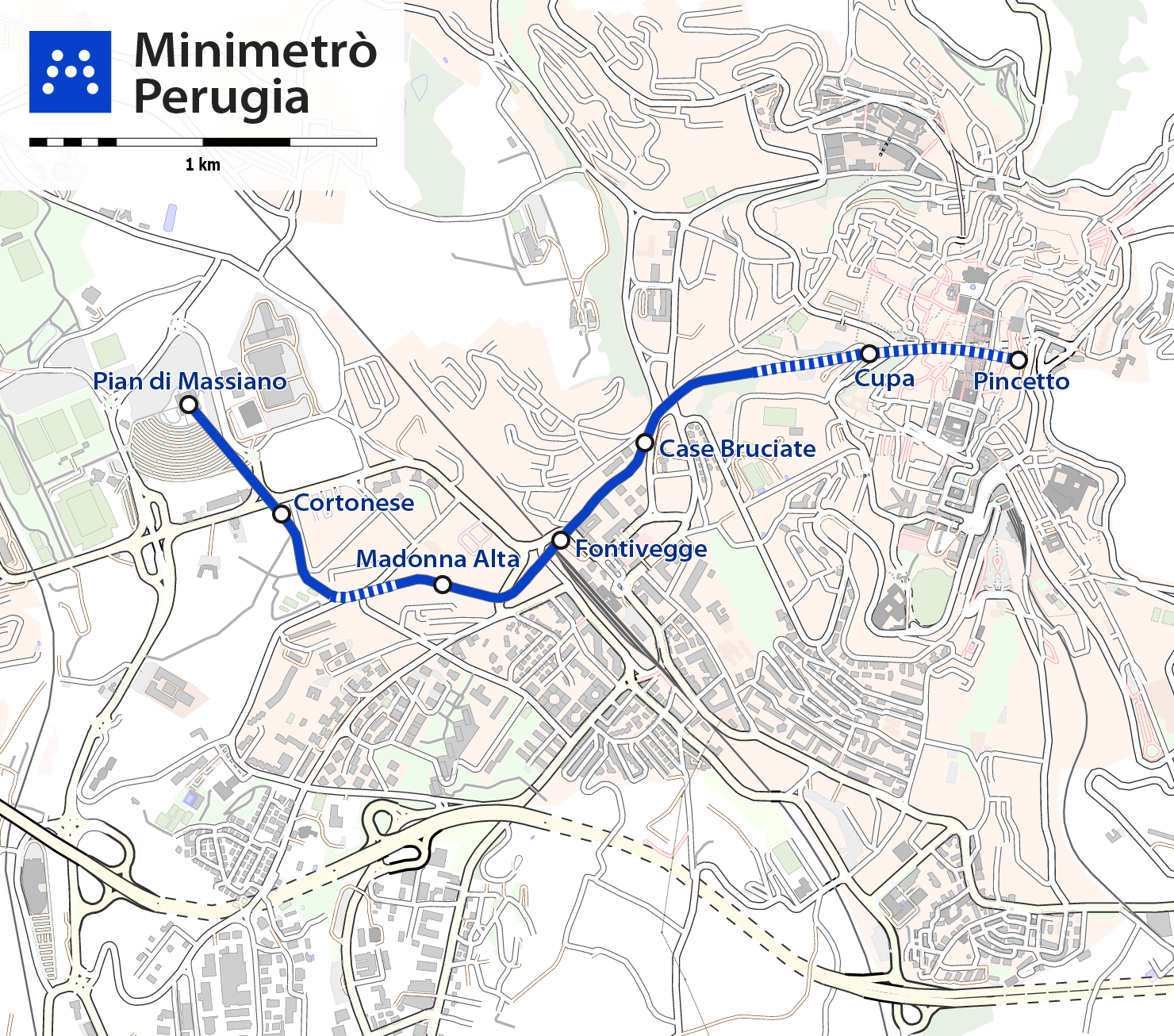
Map of the Minimetrò Perugia

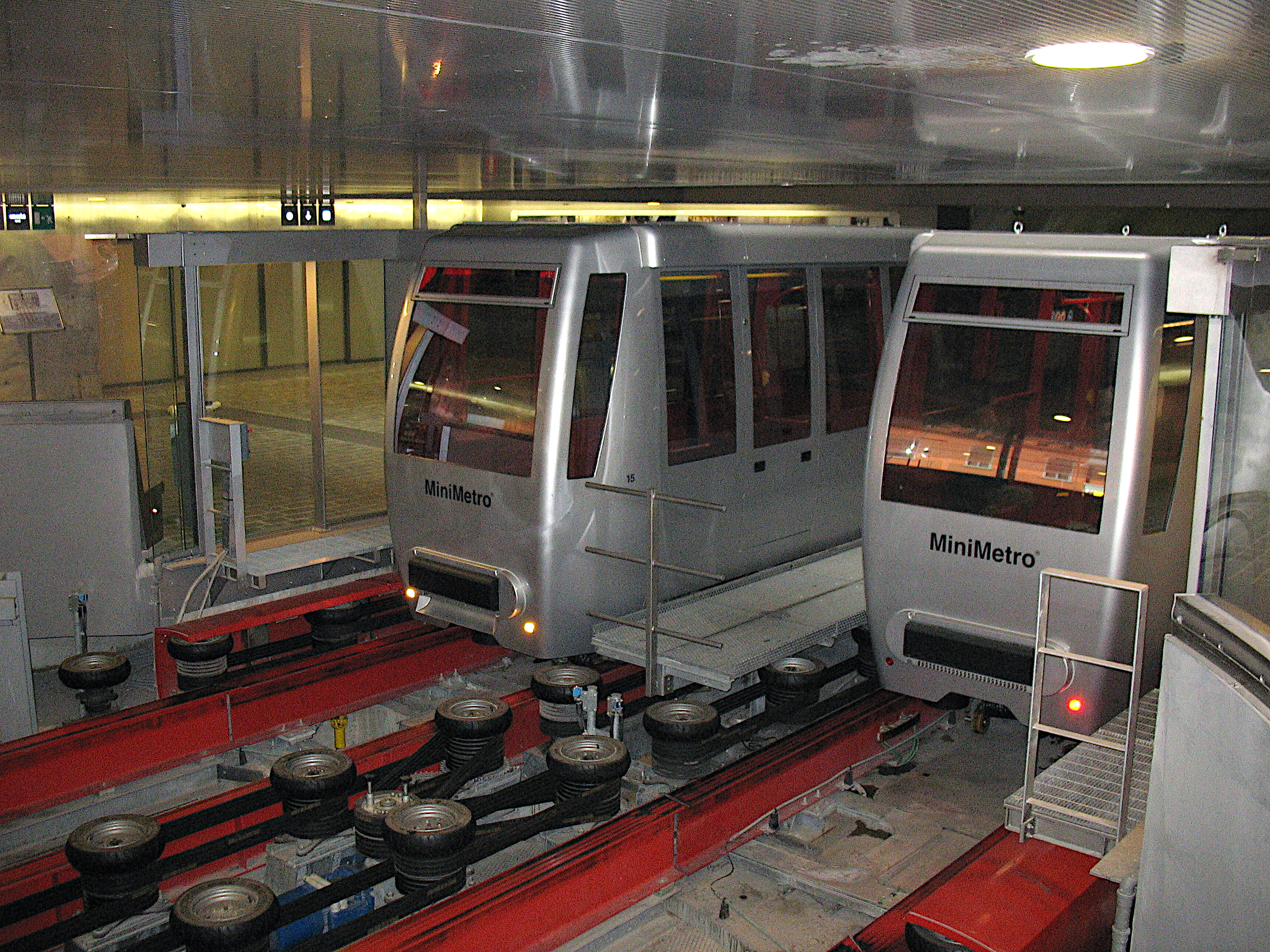
Minimetro cars at the station

MiniMetro is a family of cable-propelled automated people mover systems built by HTI Group. The vehicles run on either rails or an air cushion and have either a detachable grip (to the cable) or a fixed grip. Leitner has a test track for the vehicles in Vipiteno, Italy. The current maximum capacity of the system is around 8,000 passengers per hour. The latest system installed with the MiniMetro brand was the Miami International Airport eTrain in 2016.

== Perugia People Mover ==
In Perugia, a 3,027-meter (9,931 ft; 1.881 mi) stretch with seven stations opened in February 2008 to relieve the inner city of car traffic. It consists of more than 25 vehicles of 5 m (16 ft 4 7/8 in) each, with a capacity of 25 passengers and a speed of up to 25 kilometers (16 mi) per hour. The interval between successive vehicles is around 1.5 minutes. In 2013, the system carried 10,000 passengers per day. Plans exist for a second line.

Similar systems are under consideration in Bolzano and Copenhagen.

== Other MiniMetro installations ==
- SATUOeiras in Oeiras (Portugal). Its operations were ceased in 2015
- Squaire Metro links a car park with The Squaire groundscraper, next to the Frankfurt Airport
- ExpressTram at Detroit Metropolitan Wayne County Airport
- Cairo International Airport MiniMetro people mover
- MIA e Train at Miami International Airport – a MiniMetro people mover to satellite Concourse E, replaces 1980s APM (2016)
- Pisa International Airport is connected to the Pisa Centrale – the Pisa's main railway station by Pisamover – yet another people mover under the MiniMetro trade mark.

== See also ==
- Cable car (also known as cable tram)
- Cable Liner – a competing system from DCC Doppelmayr with mostly larger vehicles
- Former Poma 2000 in Laon, France – dismantled in 2016
- Minneapolis–St. Paul Airport Trams
- Morgantown Personal Rapid Transit
- Otis Hovair transit systems, for example, Skymetro at Zurich International Airport
- SK people mover – a similar system with smaller vehicles
