= Cincinnati Airport People Mover =

Automated people mover at Cincinnati/Northern Kentucky International Airport

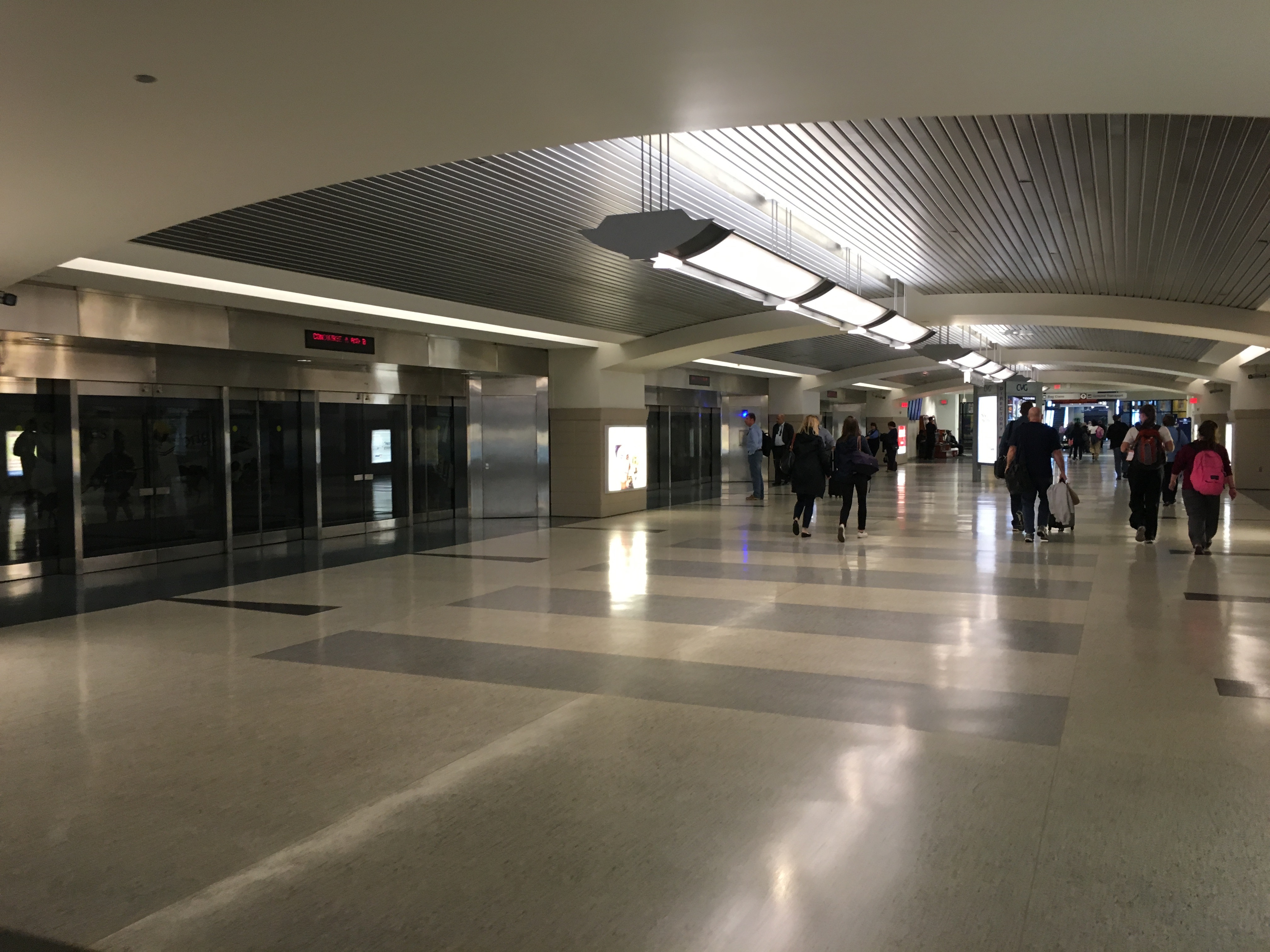
- The People Mover at CVG, which connects the Main Terminal to Concourse A and B

Overview
- Owner: Kenton County Airport Board
- Locale: Cincinnati/Northern Kentucky International Airport, Hebron, Kentucky
- Termini: Main Terminal; Concourse B
- Stations: 3

Service
- Type: People mover
- Rolling stock: 2 × Otis Hovair

History
- Opened: June 9, 1994

Technical
- Line length: 1,549 feet (472 m)

The Cincinnati Airport People Mover or Underground Train is an automated people mover that serves travelers of the Cincinnati/Northern Kentucky International Airport. It opened in 1994 to connect Terminal 3, now the Main Terminal, with Concourses A and B. The system was constructed by and was originally under the operation of Delta Air Lines.

== Technology ==
The Cincinnati Airport People Mover uses the same technology as the ExpressTram at Detroit Metropolitan Wayne County Airport and the HubTram at Minneapolis–Saint Paul International Airport.

== History ==
In the early 1990s, Delta Air Lines invested over $500 million to develop the current terminal facility (known then as Terminal 3) in Cincinnati to support their hub operation, which at its peak was Delta's second-largest hub. In September 1991, Delta announced that a people mover system would be installed to connect the new terminal and its airside Concourses A and B (the terminal also had a Concourse C, which was only accessed through shuttle buses). The system was originally announced as consisting of a pair of passenger trains, consisting of three cars seating a maximum of 71 passengers apiece for a total of 213 passengers per train. The two trains shuttle back and forth on their own guideways between 3 stops: Main Terminal (Terminal 3), Concourse A and Concourse B round-trip.

Constructed and installed by the Otis Elevator Company using its "Hovair" hovertrain technology, at the time of its construction this $16.7 million facility was only the sixth of its kind installed by Otis throughout the world. The train would be inaugurated on following a dedication ceremony on June 9, 1994.

Delta downsized the hub in the late 2000s, which led to the closure of Concourse A in 2010. Upon the closure, the people mover operated with only one train, which then skipped the Concourse A station. When Concourse A reopened for other airlines after the closure of Terminal 2 in 2012, the people mover was restored to its original service pattern with both trains operating.

By 2008, the train had completed nearly 1.5 million round trips. It was capable of over 500 round trips daily, with trains departing every 90 seconds.
