= Mini Metro =

Mini Metro or MiniMetro may refer to:

- Mini Metro (video game), a puzzle strategy video game
- MiniMetro, a family of cable propelled automated people mover systems built by Poma/Leitner Group
- Austin Metro, a supermini economy car launched as the miniMetro
