= Getty Center Tram =

People mover system in Los Angeles, USA

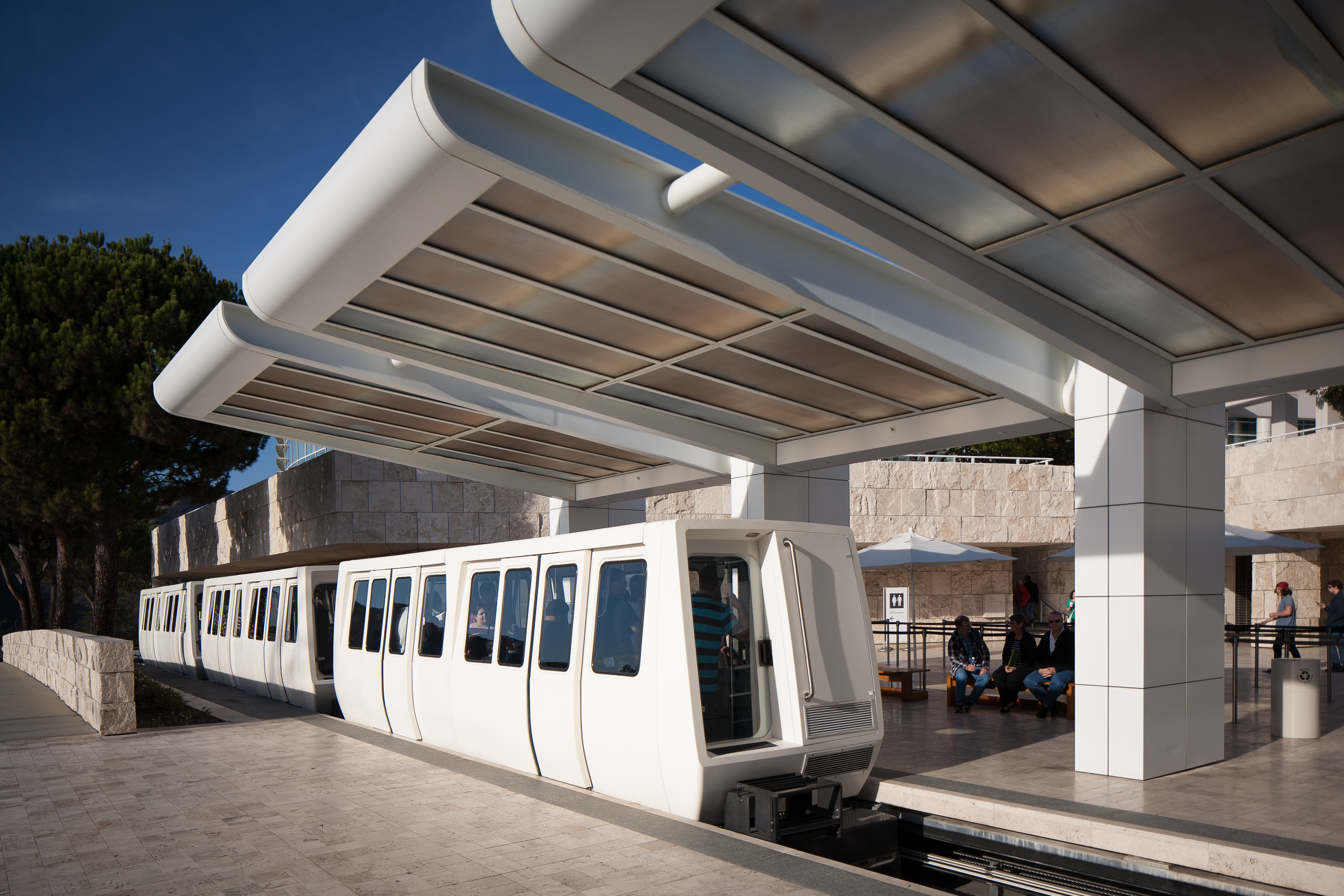
- A train at the Getty Center station

Overview
- Locale: Los Angeles, California
- Termini: Sepulveda Blvd (lower station); Getty Center (upper station)
- Stations: 2

Service
- Type: People mover
- Rolling stock: 2 × 3-car Otis Hovair

History
- Opened: December 16, 1997; 28 years ago
- Closed: March 15, 2027; 7 months' time

Technical
- Line length: 0.75 mi (1.21 km)
- Operating speed: 14 mph (23 km/h)

The Getty Center Tram is a 0.75-mile (1.21 km) people mover system that serves the Getty Center in Los Angeles. It runs two cable-driven hovertrains each consisting of three Otis Hovair vehicles.

== History ==
The tram line, already planned in 1988, was opened at the end of 1997, following the inauguration of the Getty Center. The tram consists of air-cushioned, cable-driven vehicles that are driverless. Seismically designed, the track is an elevated structure reinforced by grade beam sections. An earthquake of a 6.8 magnitude struck Northridge, California only 11 days after the tram was completed on January 6, 1994. However, the structure showed no signs of damage.

== Route ==
The line, located north of Brentwood, in the Westside Region of Los Angeles, links a freeway-level parking garage to the Getty Center, which includes the J. Paul Getty Museum. The duration of a ride is about 3 to 4 minutes.

The lower station (34°05′15.8″N 118°28′32.8″W), at the bottom of the hill, lies beside Sepulveda Boulevard and the San Diego Freeway and features a refuge siding. The upper station (34°04′42.1″N 118°28′29.9″W), at the top of the hill, is located in the arrival plaza of the Getty Center and is part of the structure. The line follows Getty Center Drive and has a passing loop in the middle, although the two trains can operate independently.

== Gallery ==
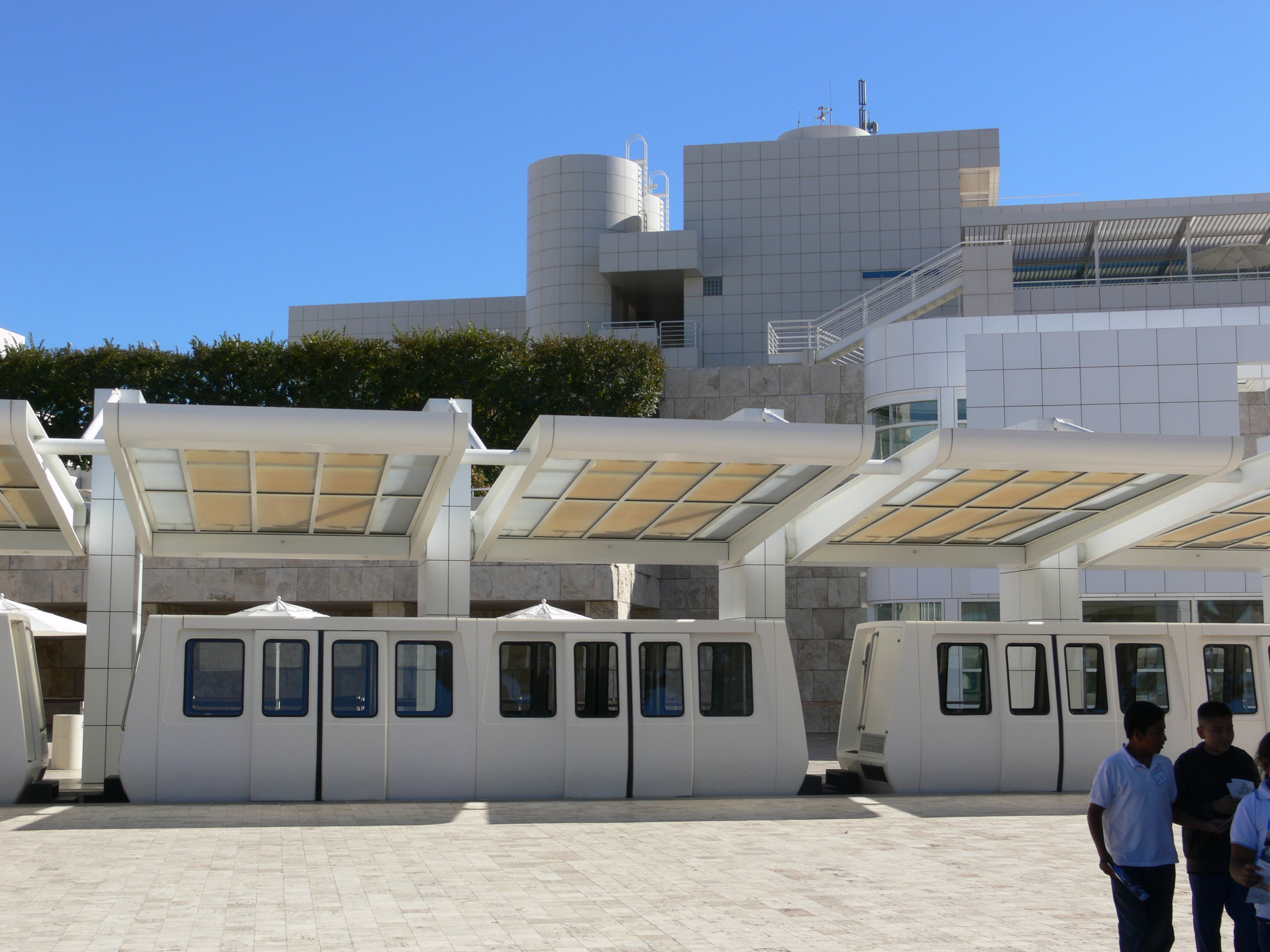
View of the upper station

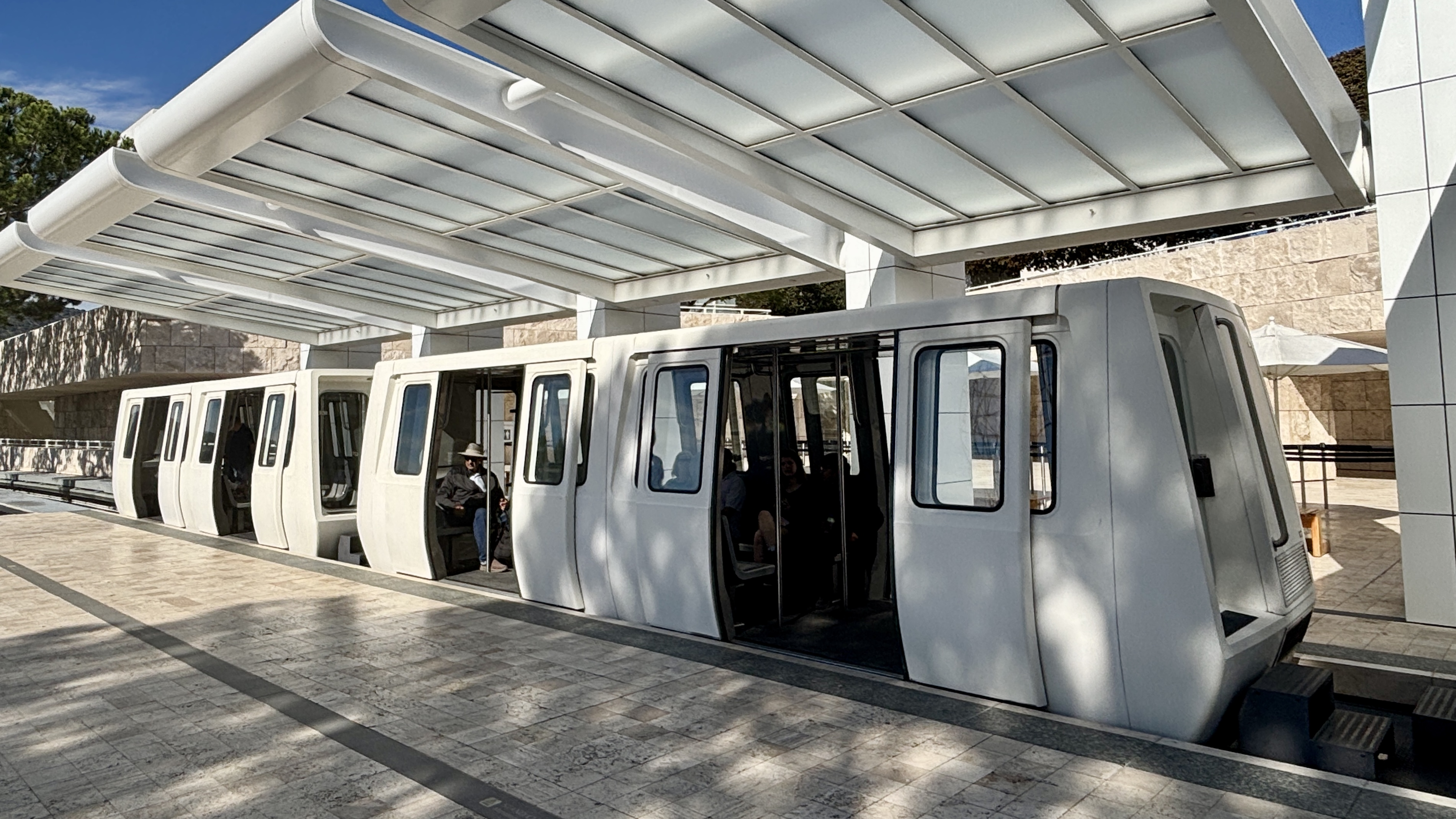
Train at the upper station

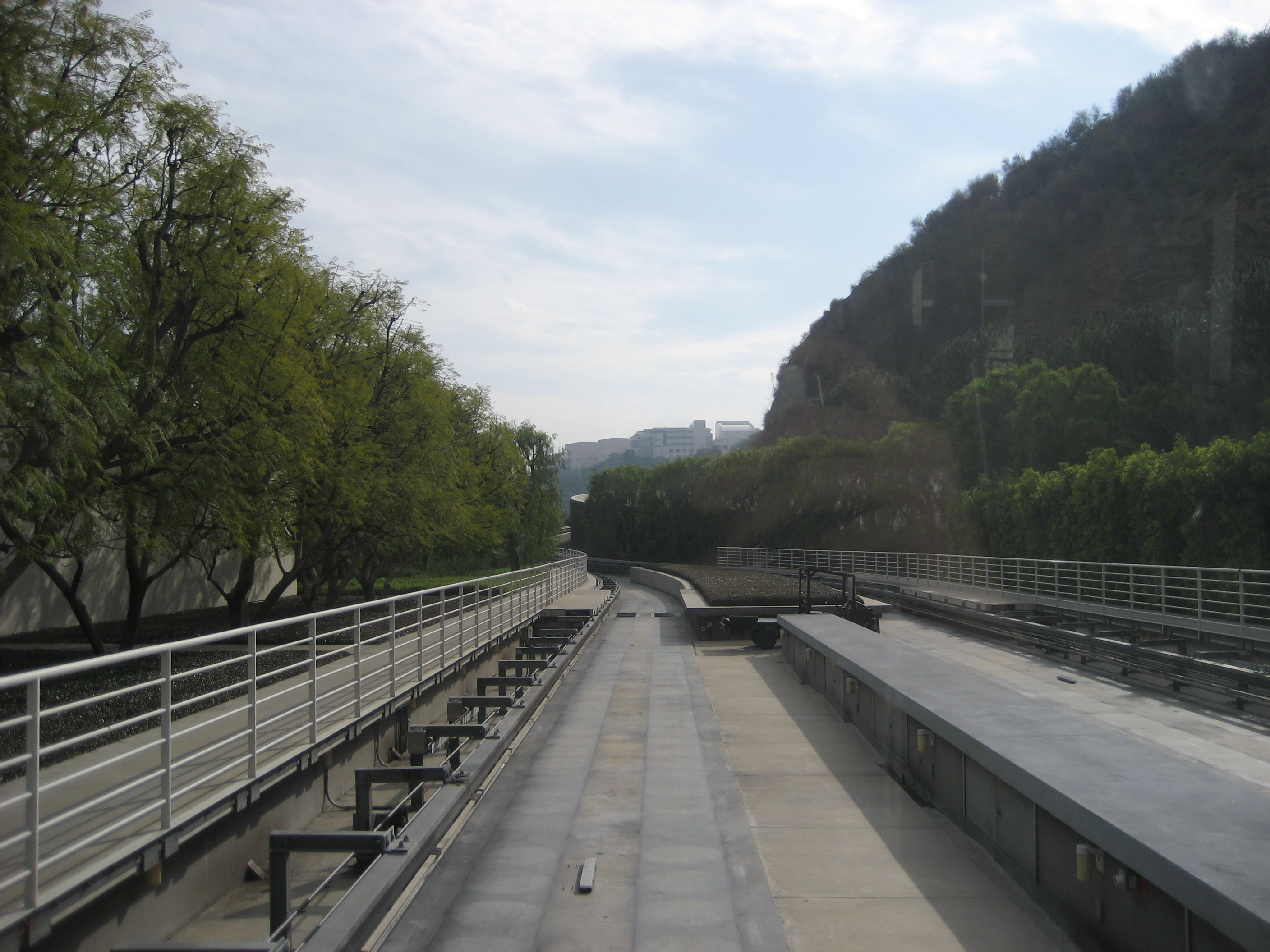
Platform of the lower station

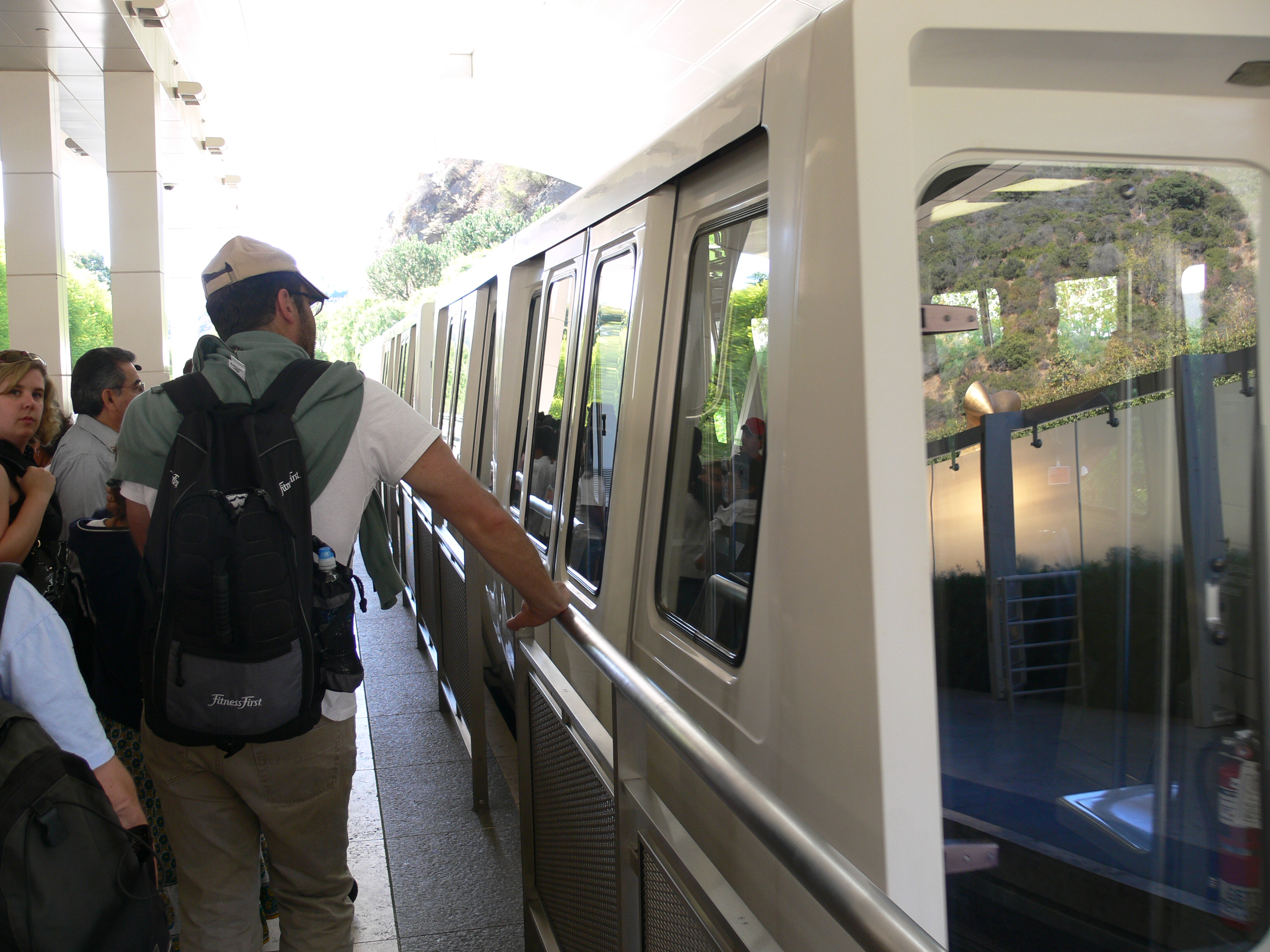
Train departing from the lower station

== See also ==
- Los Angeles County Metropolitan Transportation Authority
