= Minneapolis–St. Paul Airport Trams =

Airport people mover system

Hub Tram
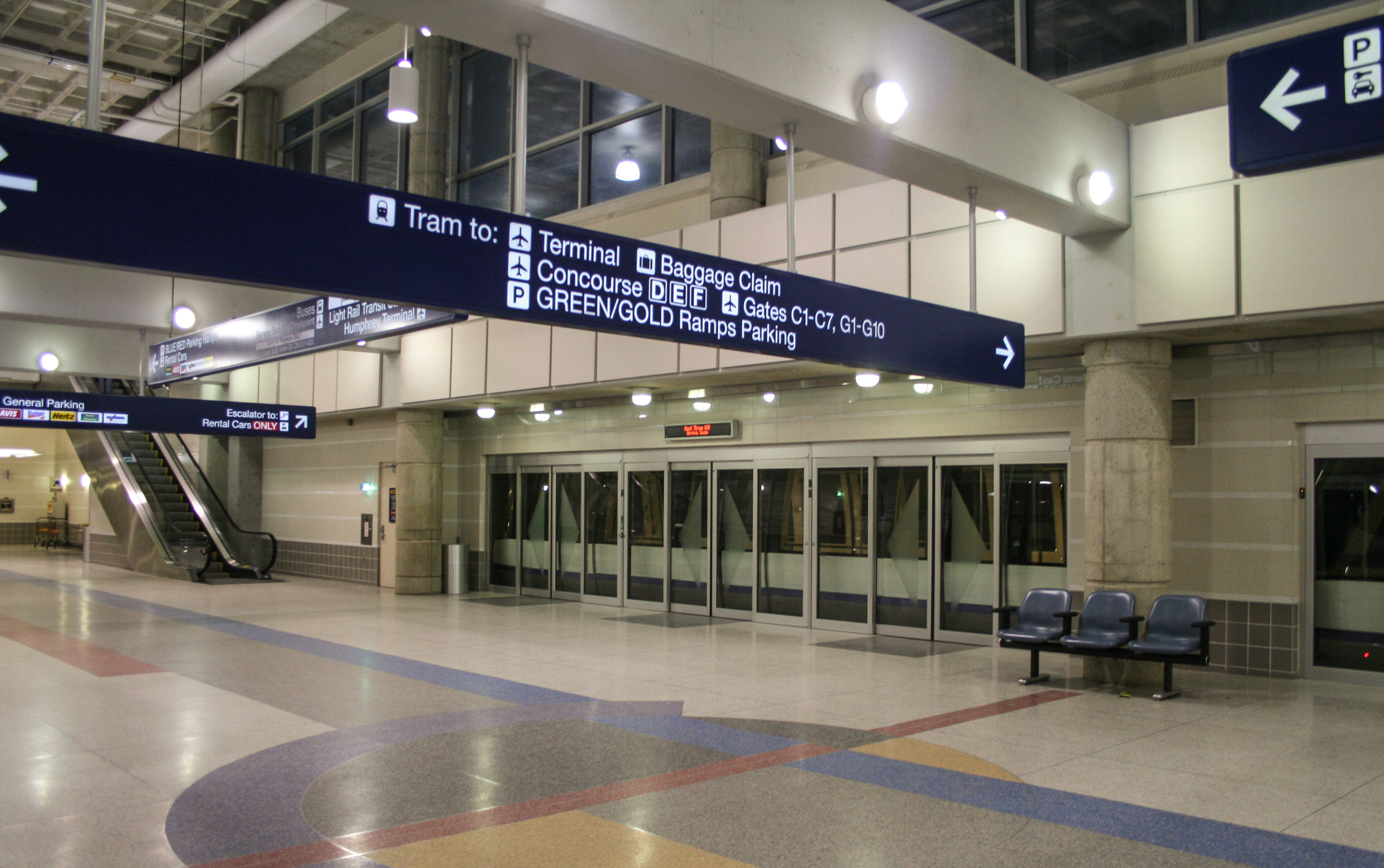

Overview
- Termini: Lindbergh Terminal; Hub Building
- Stations: 2

Service
- Type: People mover
- Services: 1
- Rolling stock: Poma-Otis Hovair

History
- Opened: April 3, 2001

Technical
- Line length: 1,100 feet (340 m)

'C' Concourse People Mover
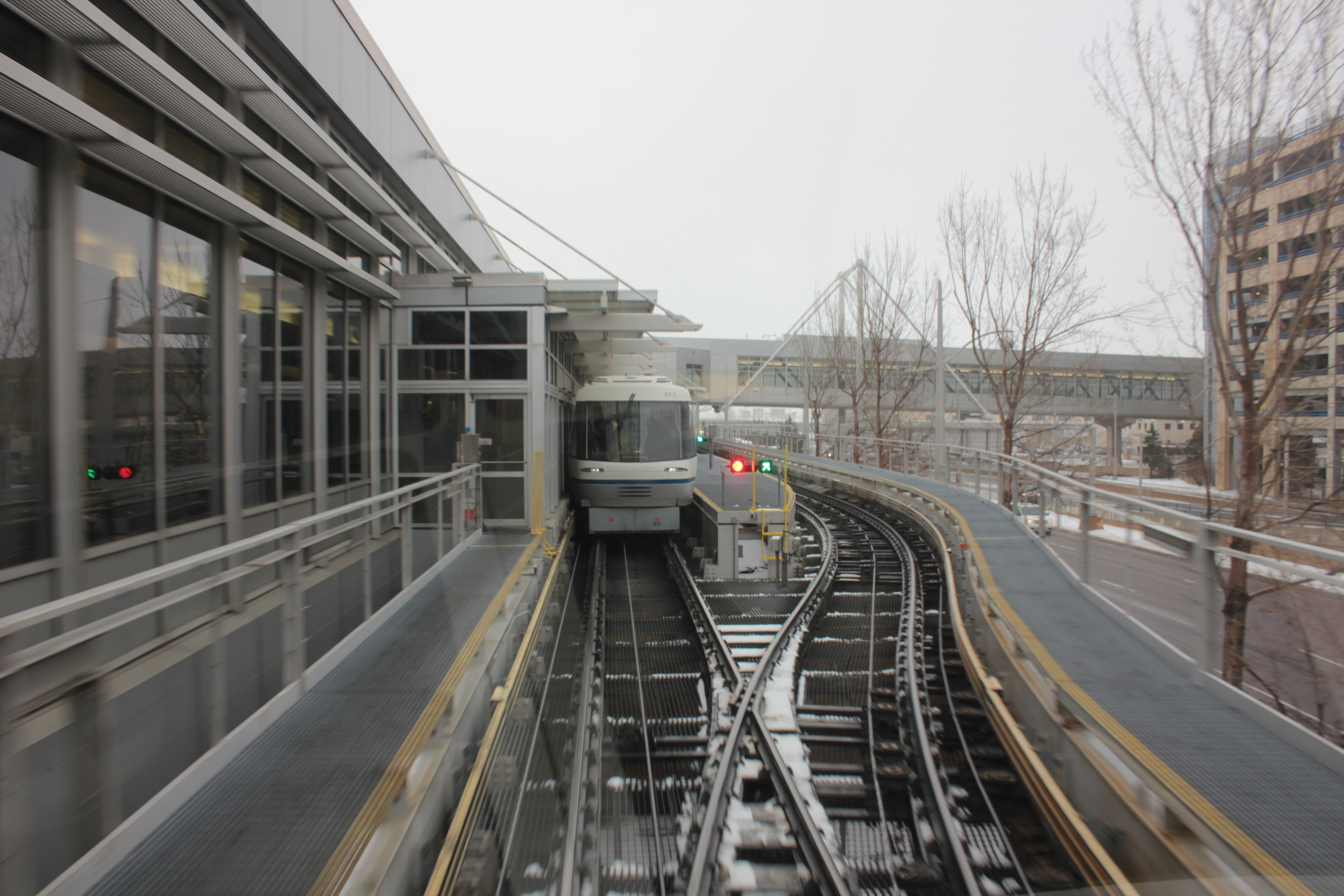

Overview
- Stations: 4

Service
- Type: People mover
- Services: 2
- Rolling stock: Poma-Otis steel-on-steel cable cars

History
- Opened: May 5, 2004

Technical
- Line length: 2,700 feet (820 m)

The Minneapolis–St. Paul Airport Trams consist of a pair of cable-drawn automated people movers that serve travelers of the Minneapolis–Saint Paul International Airport. Both were constructed by the Poma-Otis Transit Company of Farmington, Connecticut and are operated under the direction of the Metropolitan Airports Commission.

== Hub Tram ==
The older of the two systems, the Hub Tram, opened on April 3, 2001. Covering a distance of 1,100 feet (340 m), the Hub Tram is designed to quickly transport passengers between the Lindbergh Terminal and the Hub Building where travelers can find rental car service counters, a transit center and the Terminal 1–Lindbergh station, from which passengers can transfer to the Humphrey Terminal at no extra charge. Costing $25 million to complete, the Hub Tram was originally scheduled to open in Fall 2000, but a computer glitch resulted in postponing its opening. Trams on this system, which is fully underground, operate on a cushion of air and there are no physical guide rails. The technology is identical to that of the ExpressTram at Detroit Metropolitan Airport and the people mover at Cincinnati/Northern Kentucky International Airport.

== 'C' Concourse People Mover ==
The newer of the two systems, the 'C' Concourse People Mover, opened on May 5, 2004. Covering a distance of 2,700 feet (820 m), this tram is designed to quickly transport passengers between the concourses of the Lindbergh Terminal. Costing $36 million to complete, the 'C' Concourse tram was originally scheduled to open on June 1, 2002, but computer software problems and a collision with the vehicles resulted in postponing its opening to 2004. The four cars used in this system have an average top speed of 26 miles per hour (42 km/h) and, although the appearance of the vehicles is similar to the Hub Tram, they use steel wheels on steel tracks as the 'C' Concourse line is above ground and open to the elements, where ice and snow could interfere with the operation of the air cushions had it been built with Hovair technology.
