= Otis Hovair =

Hovertrain-based people mover system

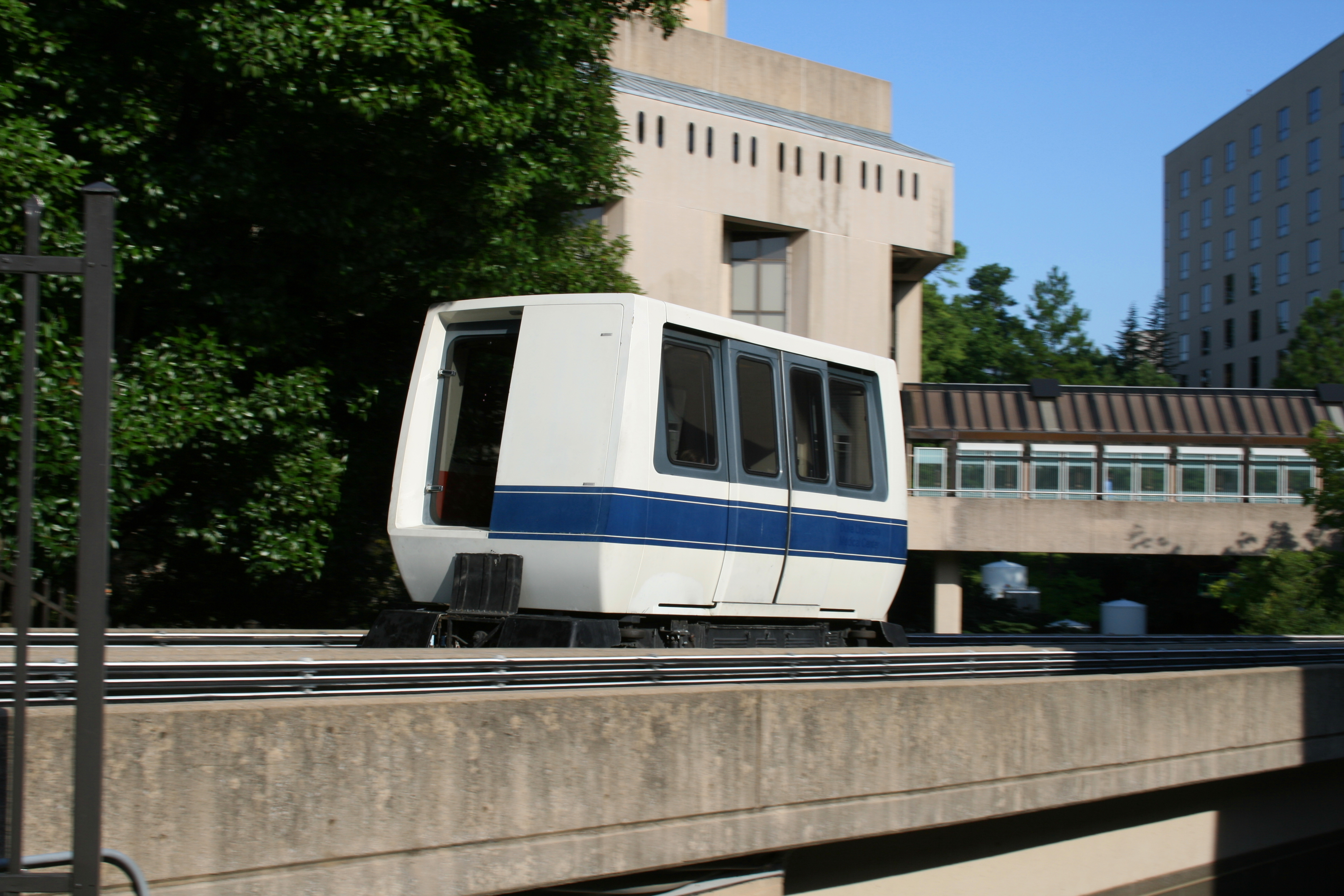
Duke Hospital PRT

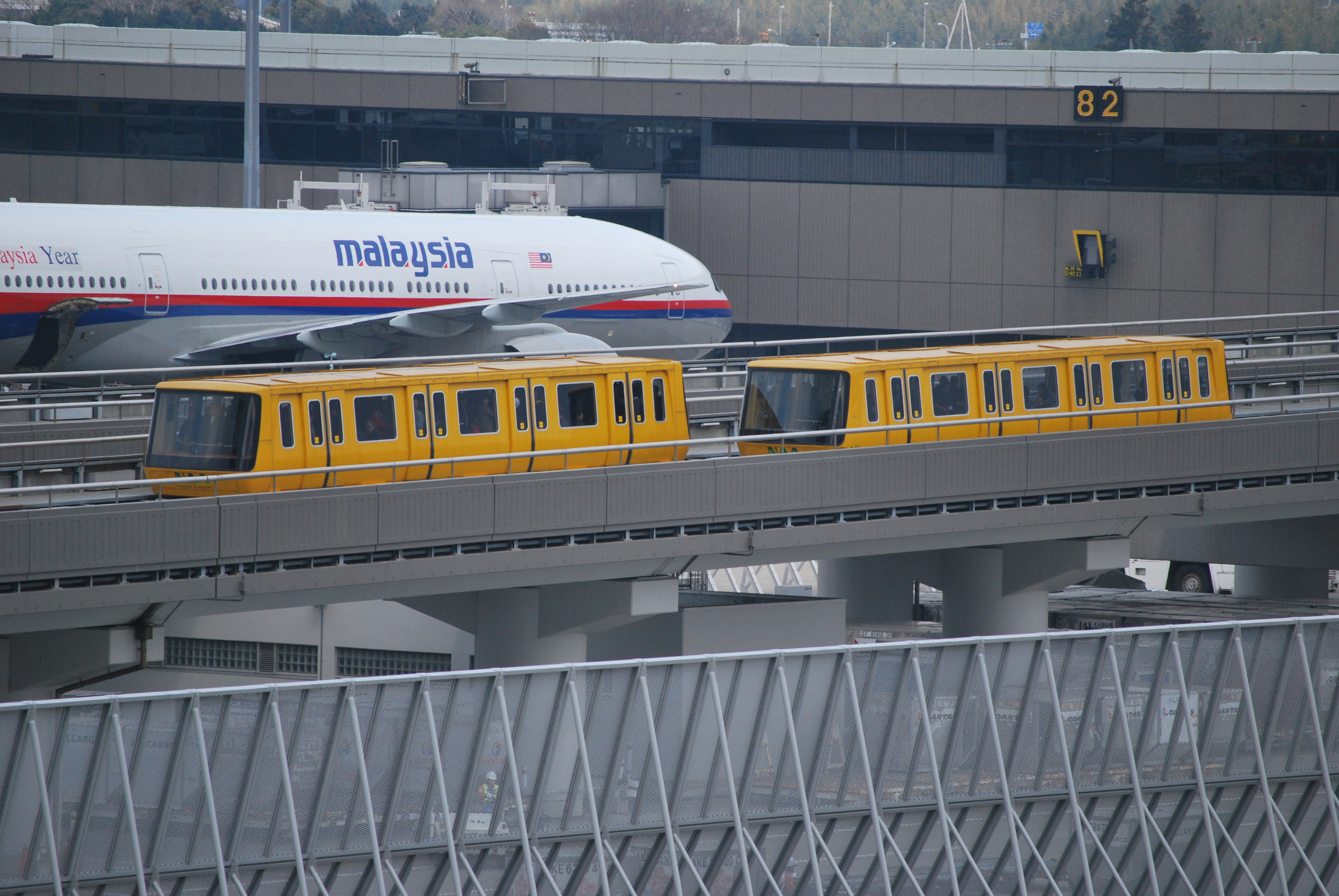
Narita Airport Terminal 2 Shuttle System

Otis Hovair Transit Systems is a type of hovertrain used in low-speed people mover applications. Traditional people mover systems used wheeled vehicles propelled by electric motors or cable traction. The Hovair replaces the wheels with a hovercraft lift pad. The aim is to reduce guideway complexity and vehicle maintenance. Another benefit is the system's ability to move in all directions, including sideways. The Hovair is the only hovertrain system to be used in commercial service.

== History ==
Originally developed at General Motors as an automated guideway transit system, GM was forced to divest the design as part of an anti-trust ruling. The design eventually ended up at Otis Elevator who replaced its linear motor with a cable pull and sold the resulting design for people mover installations all over the world. The first installation was the Duke Hospital PRT in 1979, followed by the Harbour Island People Mover opened in 1985. Otis successfully marketed the system through the 1980s and into the 1990s, but faced increasing competition from conventional systems.

In 1996, Otis formed a joint venture called Poma-Otis Transportation Systems with the French company Poma to promote these products. The partnership has since been dissolved, and as of 2014 it appears Otis is no longer involved in promoting the technology. However it is still marketed as one of the Minimetro products sold by Poma & Leitner Group. The latest installation, the Cairo Airport People Mover, opened on May 15, 2012.

== Current operators ==
- Cincinnati Airport People Mover
- ExpressTram at Detroit Metropolitan Wayne County Airport
- Getty Center Tram
- Minneapolis–St. Paul Airport Trams
- Zurich Airport Skymetro
- Cairo International Airport

== Former operators ==
- Duke University Medical Center Patient Rapid Transit
- Harbour Island People Mover
- Narita Airport Terminal 2 Shuttle System
- U-Bahn Serfaus
- Sun City (South Africa) "Skytrain" (opened 1986), 1.71 km (1.06 mi) single track with bypass ramp, two stations, two trains of three vehicles.

== See also ==
- Hovertrain
- Aérotrain
- Tracked Hovercraft
- Transpo '72
