= Skymetro =

Zurich Airport gate transfer underground people mover

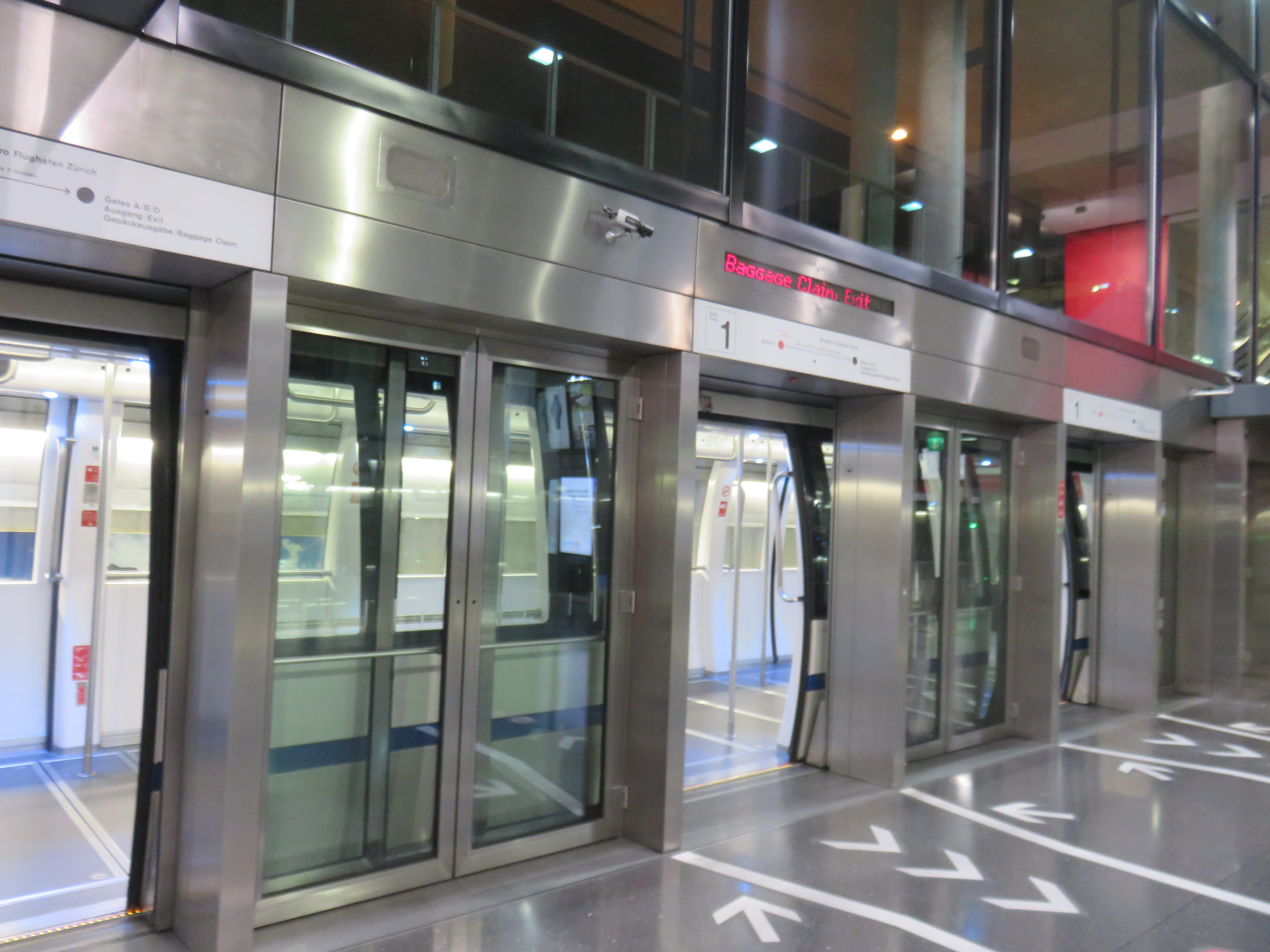
- The Skymetro in Zurich Airport

Overview
- Locale: Zurich Airport, Switzerland
- Transit type: People mover
- Number of lines: 1 double track line
- Number of stations: 2

Operation
- Began operation: 1 September 2003; 23 years ago (official opening)
- Operator: Zurich Airport

Technical
- System length: 1.1 km (0.68 mi)

The Zurich Airport Skymetro is an underground airport people mover at Zurich Airport in Switzerland. The 1.1 km (0.68 mi) long system connects the airport's main Airside Center, Gates A, B and D with its mid-field Gates E, passing underneath Runway 10/28. The line opened on 1 September 2003, and was constructed by the Otis Elevator Company.

As of 2010, Skymetro was carrying 6.73 million passengers per year, and is claimed to be the most used cable way in Switzerland. With a cost of 176 million Swiss francs it is also the most expensive cable car system and one of the most complex with high safety standards.

The tunnels of the Skymetro were equipped with Zoetrope-like films displayed on the sides which ran from 2006 to 2019, with each film consisting of a series of still frames in rapid succession, accompanied by matching sound effects played over the vehicles' public address system. Various films have been shown, including ones based around the fictional character Heidi and the Matterhorn mountain. However, these films are no longer displayed since 2013. Instead, two new films have been made for the system. The first of the two new films has shown a mid-aged woman (holding a crossbow), and her younger son (holding an apple) appeared from late 2013 to 2019, while the other replacement film shows a man waving the flag of Switzerland. However, for the first time since 2005, as of July 2019, the Zoetrope-like films have been removed.

On 30 January 2020 they implemented a new voice and film which is shown on 432 vertical pixel rows outside the skymetro. The technology was made by Adtrackmedia.

== History ==
Construction of the Skymetro tunnels started in 2000 and was completed in 2001. The first test run was undertaken in November 2002, and the line became operational in September 2003. As built, the line used three trains, each made up of two cars.

In 2009, the Skymetro was remodeled as part of a construction project known as Zurich 2010, which mainly involved the centralization of security control. With the trains expanded from two to three cars, passengers are segregated according to whether they have been screened to EU aviation security standards (whether in Zurich Airport or at their departure airport), and transported in separate cars. Glass dividers enforce this segregation at the station platforms. For the expansion Swiss cable car companies were used: the three new chassis derived from Bartholet in Flums, the cabins from Gangloff in Bern, and Altdorfer SISAG company supplied the electrical controls.

When the Skymetro opened, the audio featured a recorded female voice, however, the original voice was retired in 2008 when the current male voice debuted.

== Technology ==
Vehicles on the parallel 1,138 m (3,734 ft) long guideways are drawn by steel cables and float on an approximately 0.2 mm (0.0079 in) thick air cushion generated by on board air compressors, running over a smooth concrete guide way as in other Otis Hovair installations. Service is provided by a total of nine cars, which operate in three trains of three cars each, with each train carrying up to 157 passengers.

Trains can run in a pinched loop configuration, with trains reversing direction at each end onto the opposite track. Alternately a shuttle service can be operated, with a single train shuttling backwards and forwards on one track, or a double-shuttle service with one train on each track. In order to allow this flexibility, the traction cables are arranged into five loops: one in each of the main tunnels driven by 465 kW motors, one in each of the reversing lines driven by 266 kW motors, and one in the maintenance siding driven by a 55 kW motor. The trains can engage with, and switch between cables using hydraulic horizontally movable clamps.

The maximum speed of a Skymetro train is 47.9 km/h (29.8 mph), and the journey time between Airside Centre and Terminal E is 3 minutes.

Locations:

- Airside Center: 47.452431°N 8.560281°E
- Dock E: 47.4611°N 8.5550°E
