= ExpressTram =

Automated people mover at Detroit Metropolitan Airport

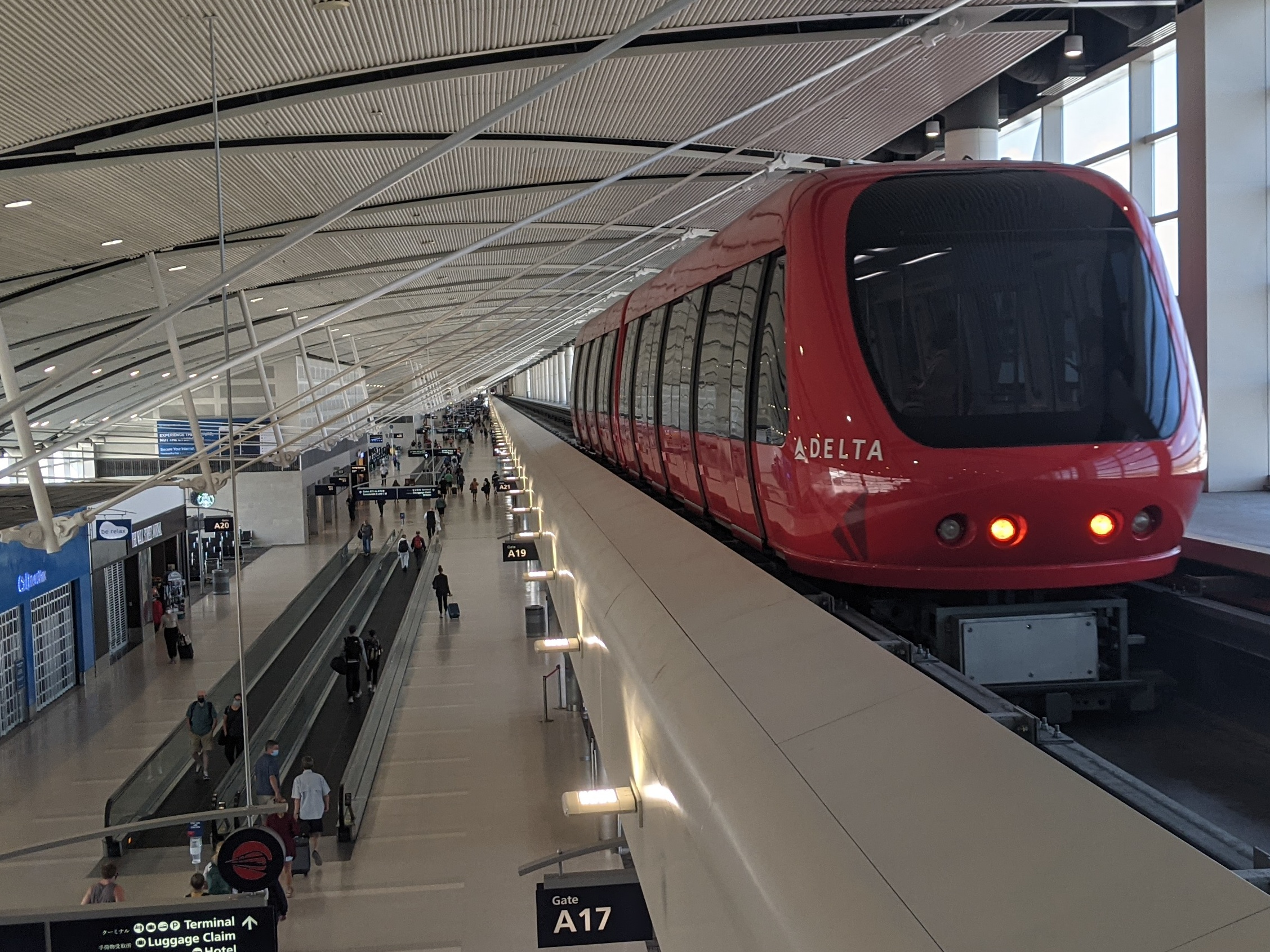
- An ExpressTram train near the south station in 2021.

Overview
- Owner: Wayne County Airport Authority
- Locale: Detroit Metropolitan Wayne County Airport, Romulus, Michigan
- Termini: McNamara Concourse A (north station); McNamara Concourse A (south station)
- Stations: 3

Service
- Type: People mover
- Operator: Otis Elevator Company
- Rolling stock: 2 × 2-car Otis Hovair

History
- Opened: February 24, 2002; 24 years ago

Technical
- Line length: 3,700 ft (0.70 mi; 1.1 km)
- Character: Serves McNamara Concourse A
- Operating speed: East Train: 31 mph (50 km/h), West Train: 26 mph (42 km/h)

The ExpressTram is an automated people mover system operating at Detroit Metropolitan Wayne County Airport, in Romulus, Michigan, United States. It is entirely contained within Concourse A of the airport's McNamara Terminal, which is the world's second-longest airport concourse.

== History ==
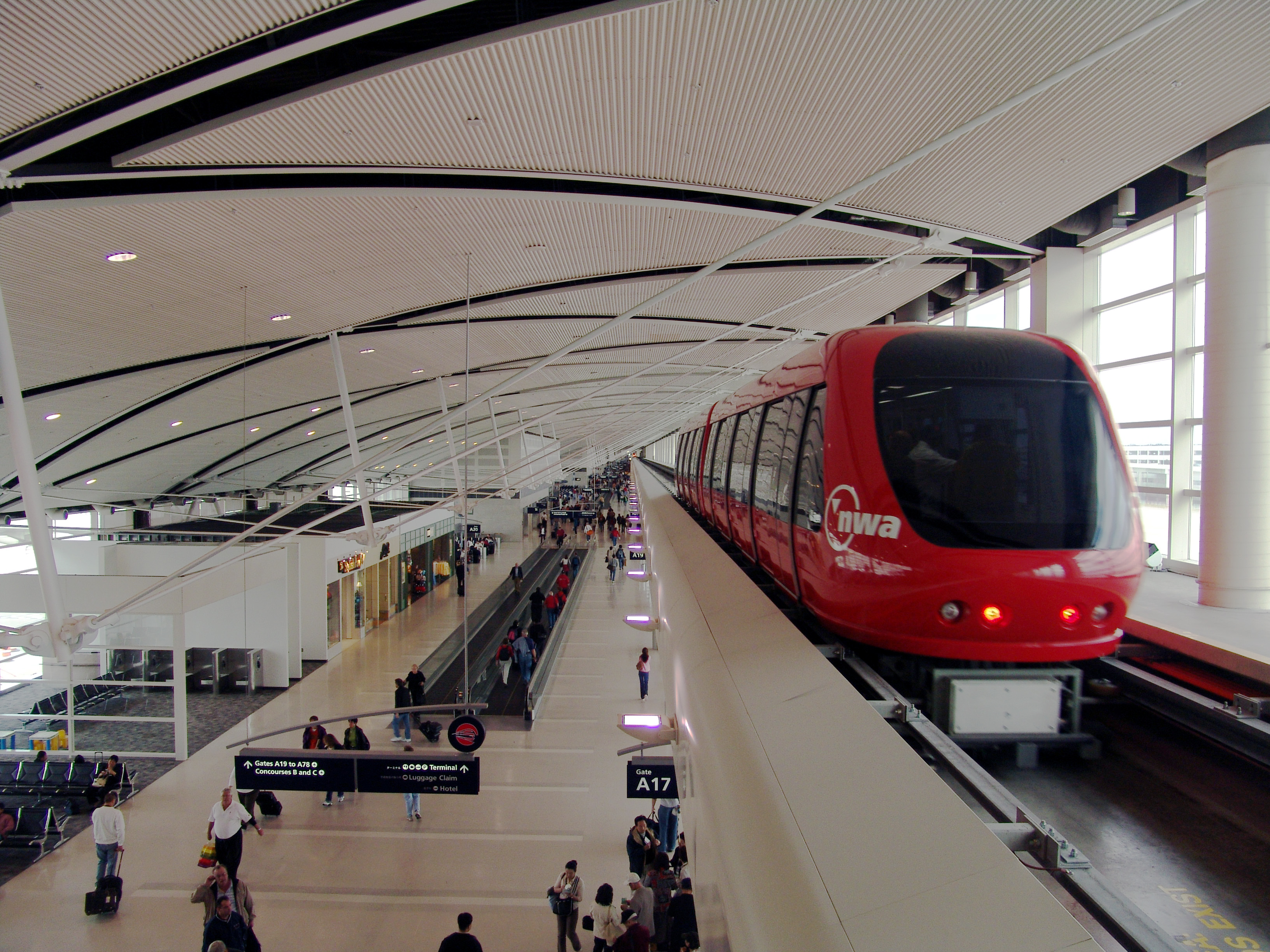
A tram in 2005 with its previous Northwest Airlines branding

Plans were announced for the McNamara Terminal in 1996 by Wayne County and Northwest Airlines, who operated their largest hub in Detroit at the time. As part of the design, a people mover on the upper level of Concourse A was planned to help transport passengers quickly thorough the 4,900-foot (0.93-mile) concourse. The people mover, which was eventually named ExpressTram, was the world's first airport people mover to operate on the inside of a terminal building, and not outdoors or in tunnels like other airports.

The ExpressTram began service with the terminal's opening on February 24, 2002. The system's two vehicles were painted red to match Northwest's branding, and originally featured the Northwest logo at each end; since Northwest merged with Delta Air Lines in 2010, they now bear the Delta logo.

The trams were refurbished in 2019.

== Technology ==
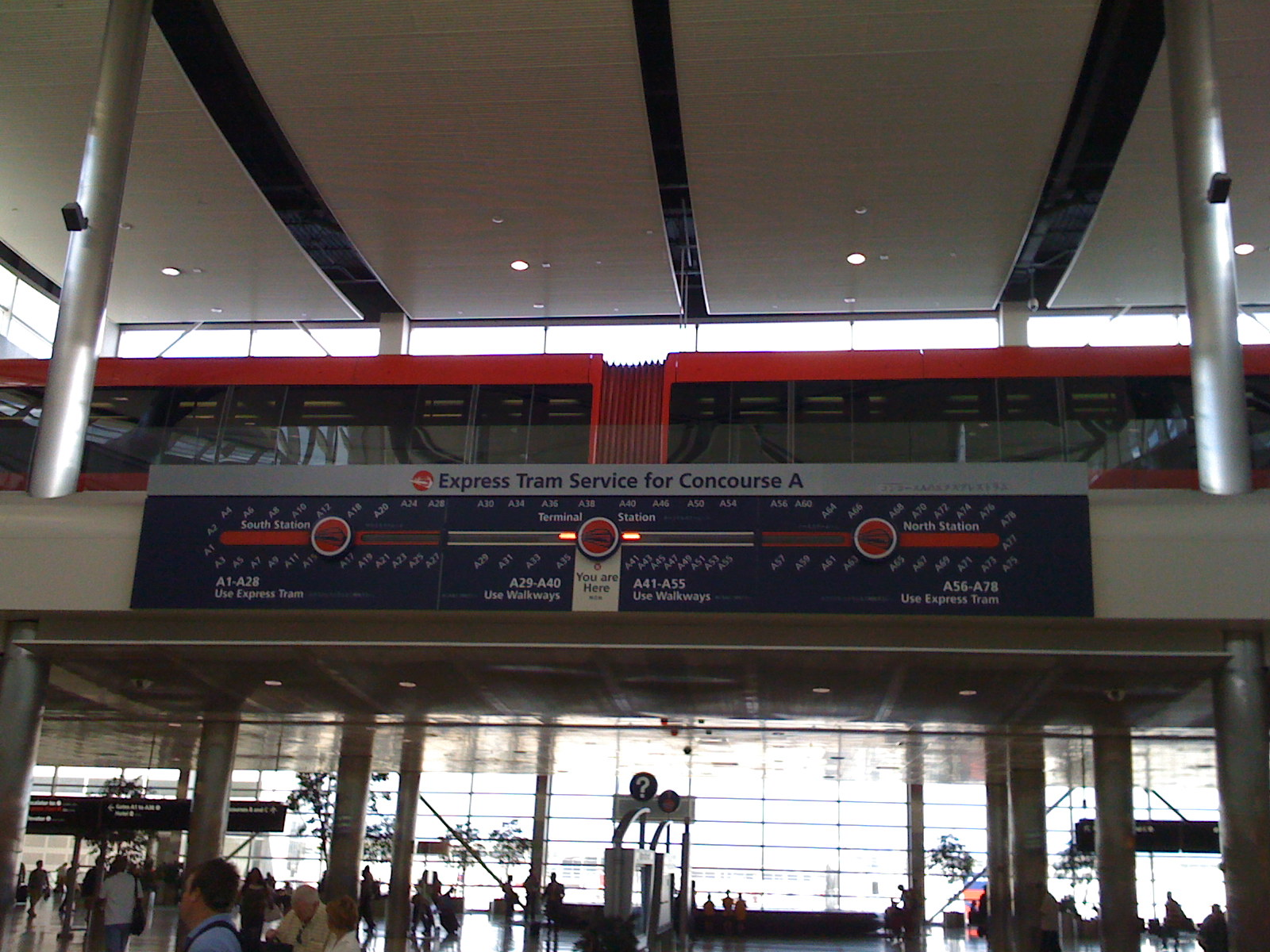
A tram at the Terminal Station

The system was designed by Poma-Otis Transportation Systems, a joint venture between Otis Elevator Company and Poma that has since been dissolved. Installation was performed by Otis, who currently operates and maintains the system.

The system operates on a 3,700-foot (1,100 m) long guideway, 21 feet (6.4 m) above the concourse's main floor. It includes two cable-driven trams that ride upon an air-cushion, similar to a hovercraft. 3 psi of air pressure is enough to lift the tram vehicles approximately 1/2" above the guideway surface. The Hovair technology used in the ExpressTram is also used in the Hub Tram and the Cincinnati Airport People Mover. Each tram is made up of two cars and can carry up to 208 passengers at a time.

LED displays in the stations, and in the trams, provide information, such as the upcoming stops, supplemented with a pre-recorded male voice which delivers audio information and warnings.

== Route ==
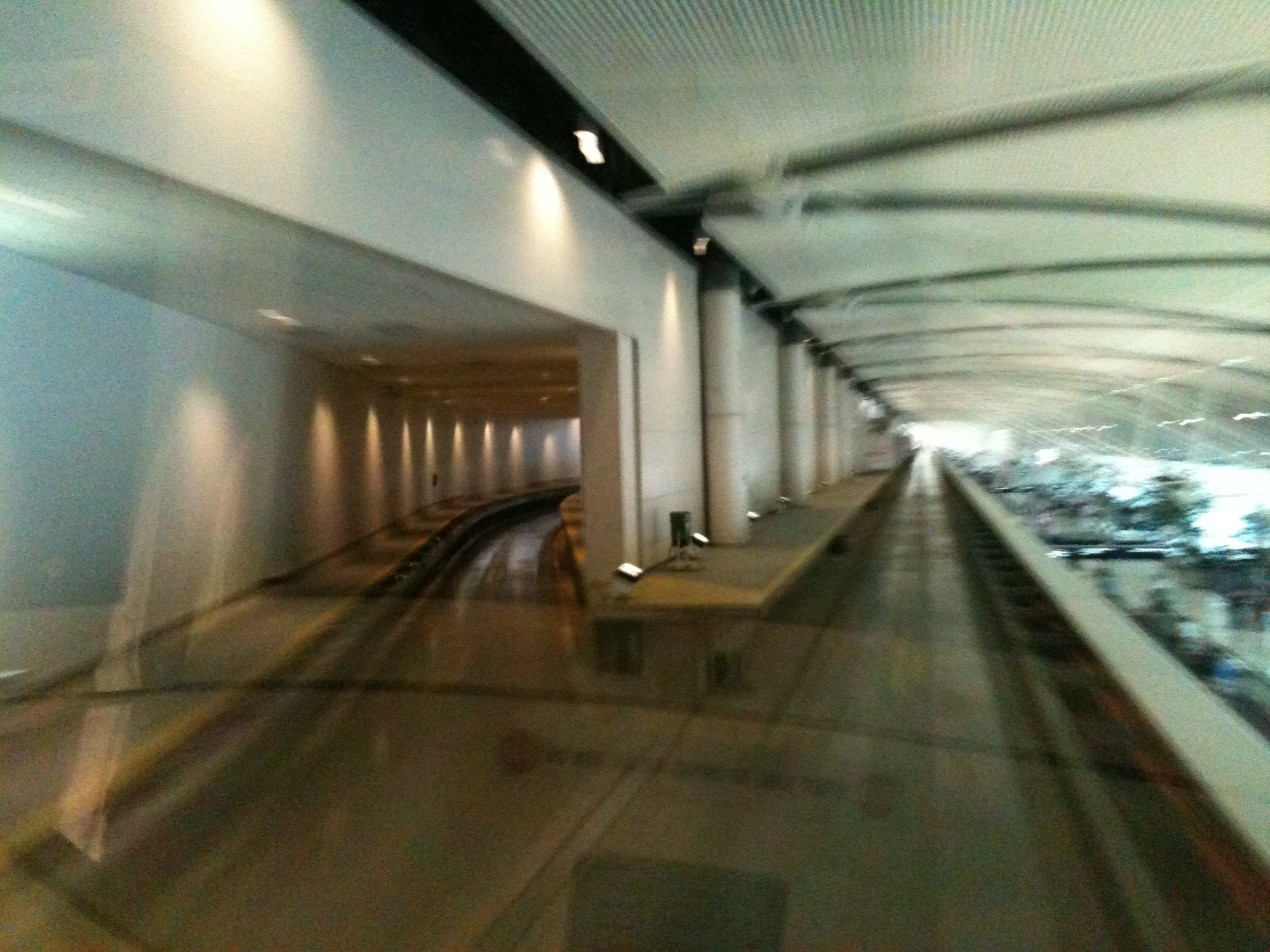
The Center Bypass at the Terminal Station

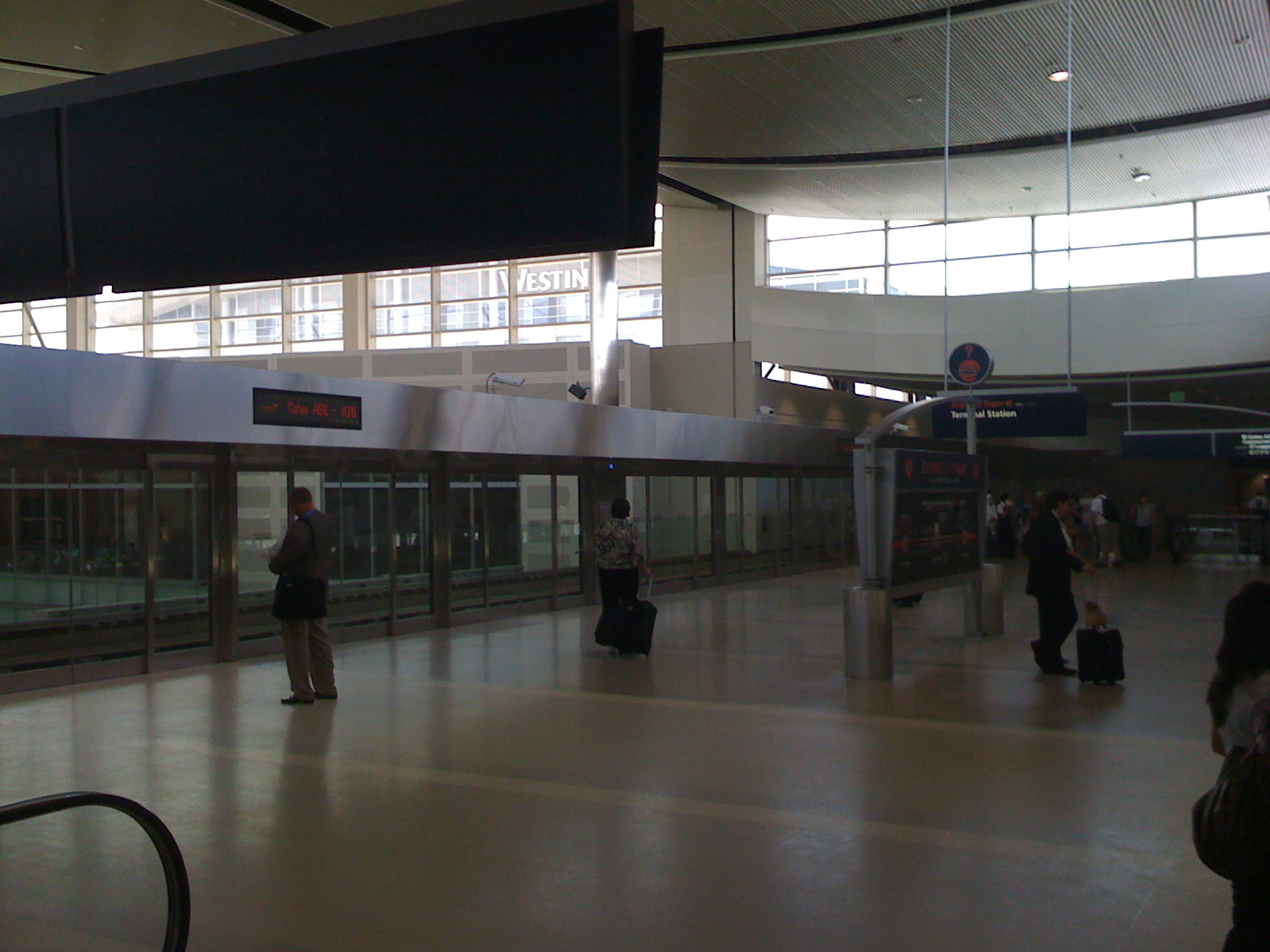
The Terminal Station

The ExpressTram services three stations along Concourse A. The stations at the ends of the concourse are named the North Station (which serves gates A56–A78) and the South Station (which serves gates A1–A28). The center station serves gates A29–A55, Luggage Claim, Ground Transportation, and Concourses B and C. The center station is officially known as the Terminal Station, based upon its close proximity to the main terminal building, which houses baggage claim, airline check-in counters, and ground transportation facilities. A maintenance garage lies beyond the North Station.

The system's primary infrastructure consists of a single guide-way. At the Terminal station, a bypass guideway splits from the main guideway allowing the two trams to pass each other. The Terminal station has an island platform between the main guideway and the bypass. Operating software attempts to keep the trams synchronized, so that the trams arrive at the Center Station simultaneously, but this is not essential. In the event that trams lose synchronization, as is frequently the case with passenger induced delays, the first tram to arrive at the Center station will be held until the opposite tram enters the bypass area, providing a clear path for the waiting tram.

Each tram takes the same path to Terminal station regardless of whether it is going northbound or southbound. One tram travels along the straight main guideway while the other tram uses the bypass to get around the first tram.

== See also ==
- Transportation in metropolitan Detroit
