= Harbour Island People Mover =

Automated guideway transit in Tampa, Florida

Overview
- Owner: Beneficial Corporation
- Locale: Tampa, Florida, US
- Transit type: People mover
- Number of lines: 1
- Number of stations: 2

Operation
- Began operation: June 27, 1985
- Ended operation: January 16, 1999
- Operator: HARTline
- Number of vehicles: Otis Hovair

Technical
- System length: 2,500 feet (760 m)
- Track gauge: Concrete guideway

The Harbour Island People Mover was an automated guideway transit people mover service in Tampa, Florida, United States that carried passengers between Downtown Tampa and Harbour Island across the Garrison Channel. Privately owned but operated by the Hillsborough Area Regional Transit Authority (HART), service commenced on June 27, 1985. Due to low ridership and operating losses, the service was discontinued on January 16, 1999. The money given to the city for the closure of the system in a settlement with ownership served as the foundation of an endowment to cover the operating expenses of the TECO Line Streetcar.

== Description ==
Developed by the Beneficial Corporation and utilizing Otis Transportation Systems, the people mover was completed at a cost of $7 million. The 2,500-foot (760 m) concrete guideway was elevated and spanned the Garrison Channel. Operating between 7:00 a.m. and 2:00 a.m, the Harbour Island People Mover made approximately 620 trips per day with a maximum capacity of 100 passengers per trip. The system ran in a north–south direction between the downtown station located on the third level of the Old Fort Brooke parking garage and its southern terminus at the Shops of Harbour Island on Harbour Island.

== History ==
Ground was broken for the project on September 20, 1983, as a part of the greater Harbour Island development project undertaken by Beneficial Corporation and its chief executive Finn M. W. Caspersen. When the Harbour Island People Mover opened for service on June 27, 1985, it marked the return of rail transit to Tampa since the closure of its streetcar network in 1946. Costing $7 million to complete, former President Gerald Ford took part in the inaugural ride. Although it opened to much fanfare, ridership of the system remained relatively low. By 1989, ridership averaged 1,200 riders on a weekday and 1,500 on the weekend or for an average of about 2 riders per trip. The low ridership was attributed to the perceived difficulty in accessing the downtown station and the addition of a lunch-time shuttle bus service between downtown and Harbour Island by January 1989.

By 1995, the Hillsborough County Metropolitan Planning Organization approved funding to initiate the preliminary engineering for the construction of a third station at the Tampa Convention Center. With the system losing approximately $1 million between 1994–95 due to increasing operating costs and dwindling ridership due to the closure of the Shops of Harbour Island, Beneficial Corporation sought to sell the system to HART for only $1. However, since the system was losing substantial amounts of money, HART declined to purchase it from Beneficial. By July, Beneficial announced the people mover would cease operations if the convention center station was not completed along the line.

With the prospects of a convention center station stalling, by 1998 Beneficial was looking to shut down the people mover. As a result of a contract with HART calling for the agency to be in charge of operating the system for thirty years, negotiations had to be undertaken with the city to dissolve the contract since it was good through 2015. By May 1998, an agreement was reached calling for the dismantling of the people mover system and for Beneficial to pay the city $5 million to dissolve the contract. Harbour Island would then be served by trolley replica buses and the majority of the settlement money would go to an endowment to be used in the operating costs of the subsequently built TECO Line Streetcar. The line ceased operations on January 16, 1999. After determining the Garrison Channel bridge was unsuitable for use as a pedestrian crossing, demolition began in November 1999 and was completed by February 2000. Today, the Harbour Island station, located inside the Knights Point commercial development serves as Jackson's Bistro Bar & Sushi restaurant's private Waterfront Room. The elevator leading up to this room still titles the level as the People Mover. The downtown station in the parking garage serves as parking administration offices.

== See also ==
- Tampa International Airport People Movers
