= Duke University Medical Center Patient Rapid Transit =

Transport system in Duke University Medical Center

Personnel Rapid Transit
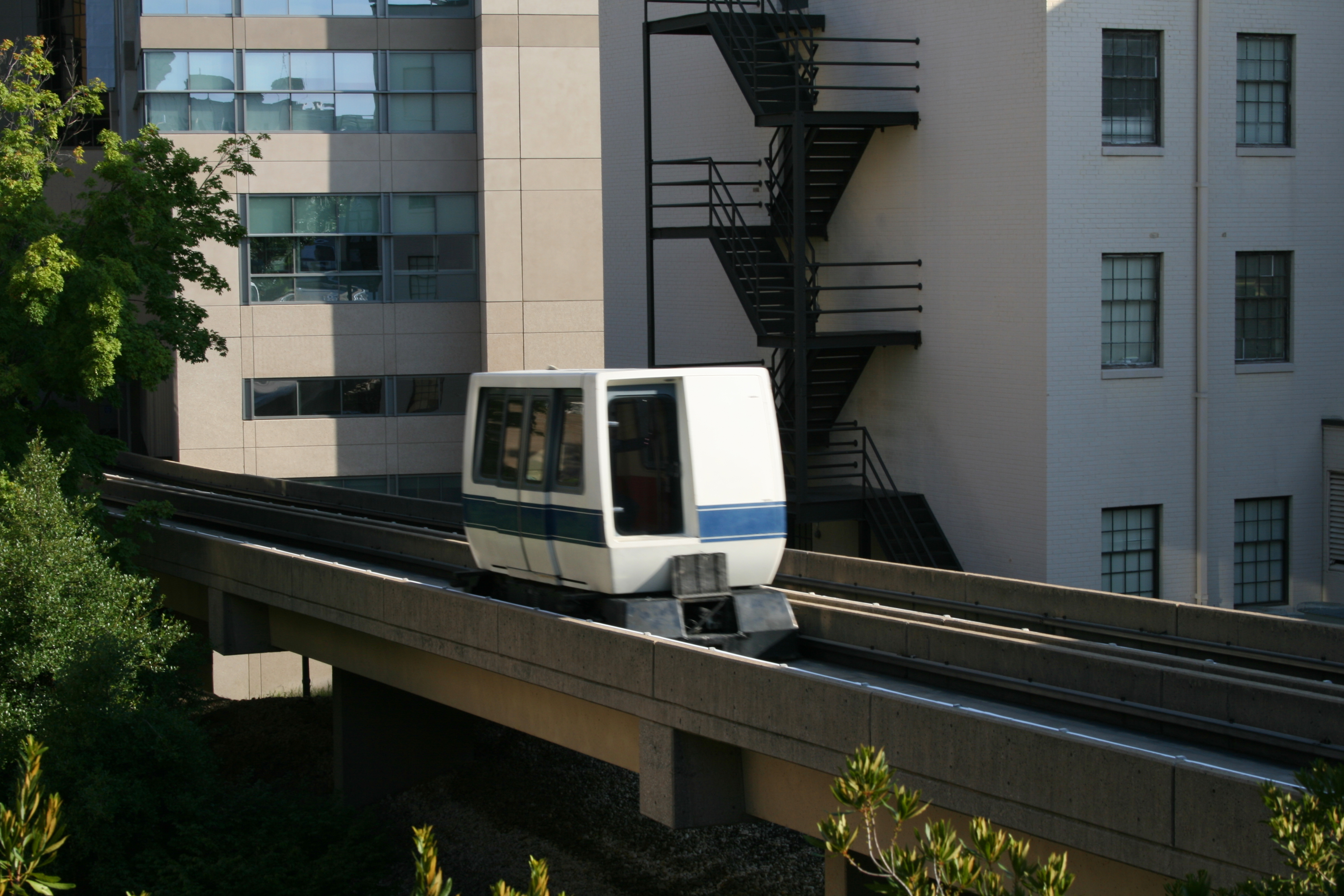

Overview
- Locale: Durham, NC, US
- Transit type: People mover
- Number of stations: 3

Operation
- Began operation: December 8, 1979
- Ended operation: 2009
- Operator: Duke University
- Number of vehicles: 3

Technical
- Track gauge: concrete guideway

Duke University Medical Center Patient Rapid Transit or Personnel Rapid Transit (PRT) was an automated people mover system located at the Duke University Medical Center in North Carolina, in the United States. The system was in operation from 1979 to 2009. The PRT was notable for having cars propelled by a linear induction motor and suspended on a bed of compressed air similar to a hovercraft. Uniquely, the cars could move sideways, as well as backwards and forwards.

The proclaimed "horizontal elevator" system was designed by Otis Elevator Company during the 1970s, installed beginning in 1977 and opened on December 8, 1979. The PRT had three driverless Otis Hovair vehicles which had a hinged-window at each end for emergency exit.

The concrete guideway was built as double track, connecting the three stations at Duke South, Duke North and Parking Garage II via a tunnel under Erwin Road.

== Decommissioning ==
The 0.25-mile (<400 m) section between Duke South and Duke North was closed permanently on October 15, 2008, to allow for expansion of the hospital buildings.

The remaining section connecting Duke Parking Garage II with Duke North Hospital was closed between late 2008 and early 2009. The doorway for the station at Parking Garage II was permanently boarded up and turned into a wall. The leftover tracks and infrastructure have since been largely removed to make way for new construction.

== Technology ==
The Hovair technology has been installed around the world. Later variants have used the same air-cushion technology, but propelled the vehicles by wire cable, such as the Getty Center Tram at the Getty Center in Los Angeles.
