= Poma 2000 =

Defunct people mover (1989-2016)

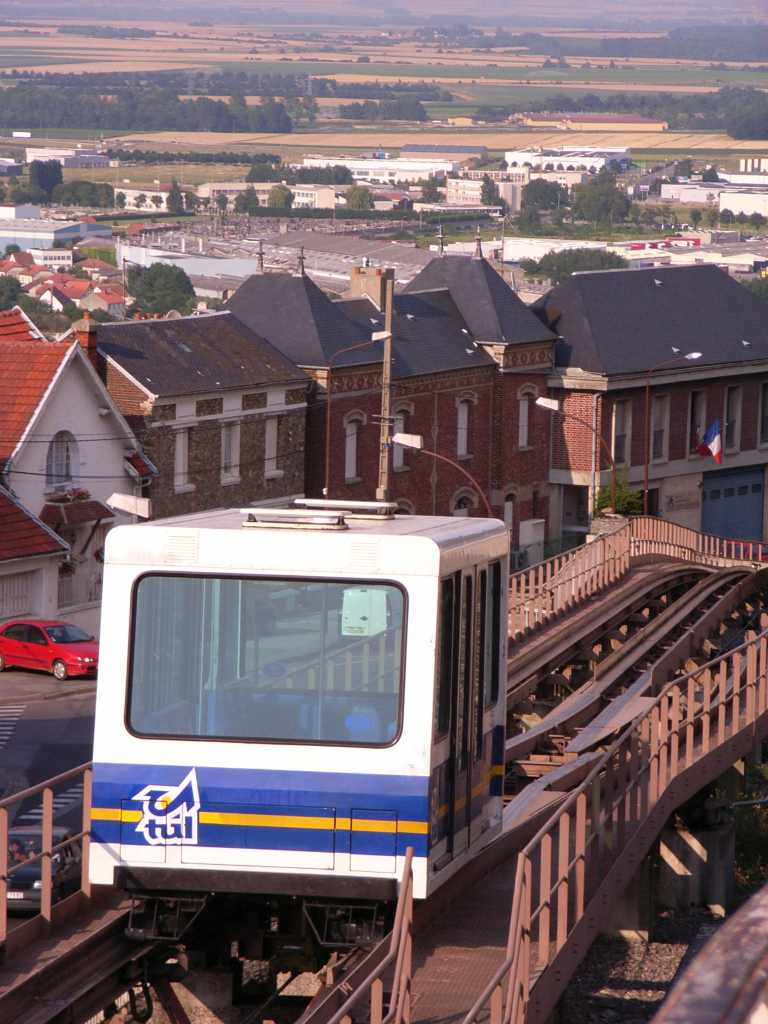

Overview
- Locale: Laon
- Transit type: People mover
- Number of lines: 1
- Number of stations: 3
- Daily ridership: 2500

Operation
- Began operation: 4 February 1989
- Ended operation: 27 August 2016
- Number of vehicles: 4

Technical
- System length: 1.5 km (0.9 mi)

The Poma 2000 in Laon, France, was an automated guideway transit, a cable-driven people mover which ran between the railway station and the city hall. The system was 1.5 km (0.93 mi) long with a maximum gradient of 13% and an elevation change of 100 metres (330 ft).

== History ==
The system opened in 1989, replacing a former tram line (1899–1971), that used a rack for braking but not propulsion. There were three stations. The cars ran on rubber tyres on a metallic track at a 2.5 min headway. Four vehicles were used by the system, and each of them could carry 33 passengers at a maximum speed of 35 km/h (22 mph). The maximum capacity was 900 passengers/hour, and most recent ridership before its closure was about 1500 passengers/day.

The system ran every day from 7:00 a.m. to 8:00 p.m. from Monday to Saturday and every day in summer. A complete journey on the line from Gare to Hôtel de Ville took 3.5 min.

Citing €19 million maintenance costs and rising local taxes, the Agglomeration Community of Pays de Laon ended the service on 27 August 2016.

== Route ==
Geographically accurate map of the Poma 2000

== See also ==
- List of rapid transit systems
