= Narita Airport Terminal 2 Shuttle System =

Former Airport People Mover at Narita Airport, Japan

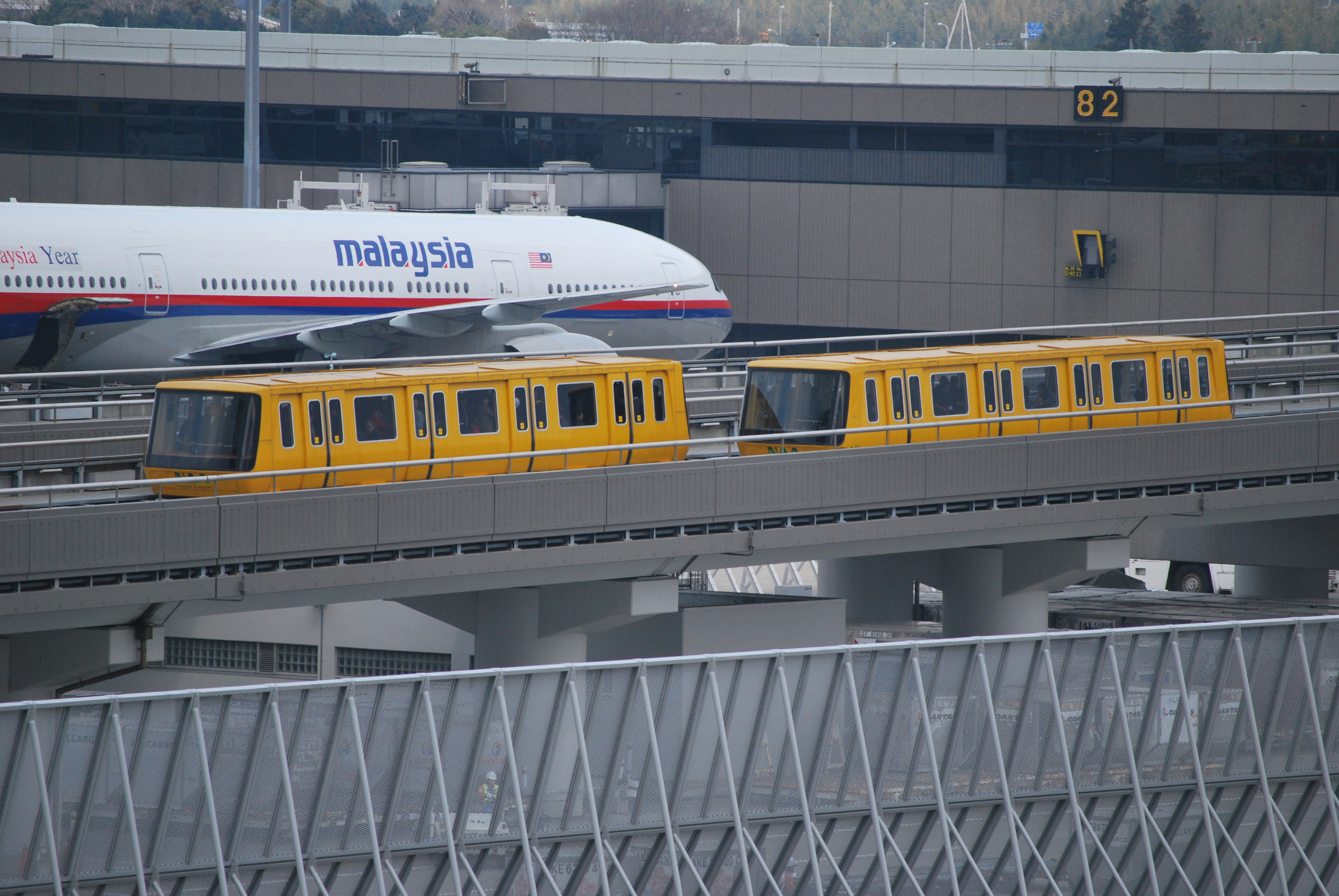
- The Narita Airport Terminal 2 Shuttle System in March 2008 with a Malaysian airline aircraft behind

Overview
- Locale: Terminal 2 of Narita International Airport, Narita, Japan
- Transit type: People mover
- Number of lines: 1
- Number of stations: 2

Operation
- Began operation: 6 December 1992
- Ended operation: 27 September 2013
- Operator: Narita International Airport Corporation

Technical
- System length: 279 m (915 ft)

The Narita Airport Terminal 2 Shuttle System (成田空港第2ターミナルシャトルシステム, Narita Kūkō Dai-ni Tāminaru Shatoru Shisutemu) was an automated people mover used in Narita International Airport, Narita, Chiba Japan. The system operated between 1992 and 2013.

== History ==
The Shuttle System opened in 1992 with the opening of Terminal 2 of Narita International Airport, the international airport serving the Greater Tokyo Area. The shuttle linked the main building of the terminal and its satellite, 279 metres away. The whole ride took a minute, and was free of charge.

The system was made by Nippon Otis Elevator, a company specialising in elevators and escalators. It was technically (and legally) not a railway, but a horizontal elevator; cars were attached to a cable that moved them, like a funicular. The cars did not have wheels; instead, they floated on a 0.2-mm layer of compressed air. This was the first use of such a system to be used in an airport, as well as the first in Japan.

A new walkway between the main and satellite buildings had opened on September 27, 2013, whereafter the people mover ceased operations. The space formerly used by the shuttle was converted into moving walkways and shops.

== See also ==
- List of airport people mover systems
- U-Bahn Serfaus
- Hovertrain
- Tracked Hovercraft
- Aérotrain
