= Hovertrain =

Type of high-speed train

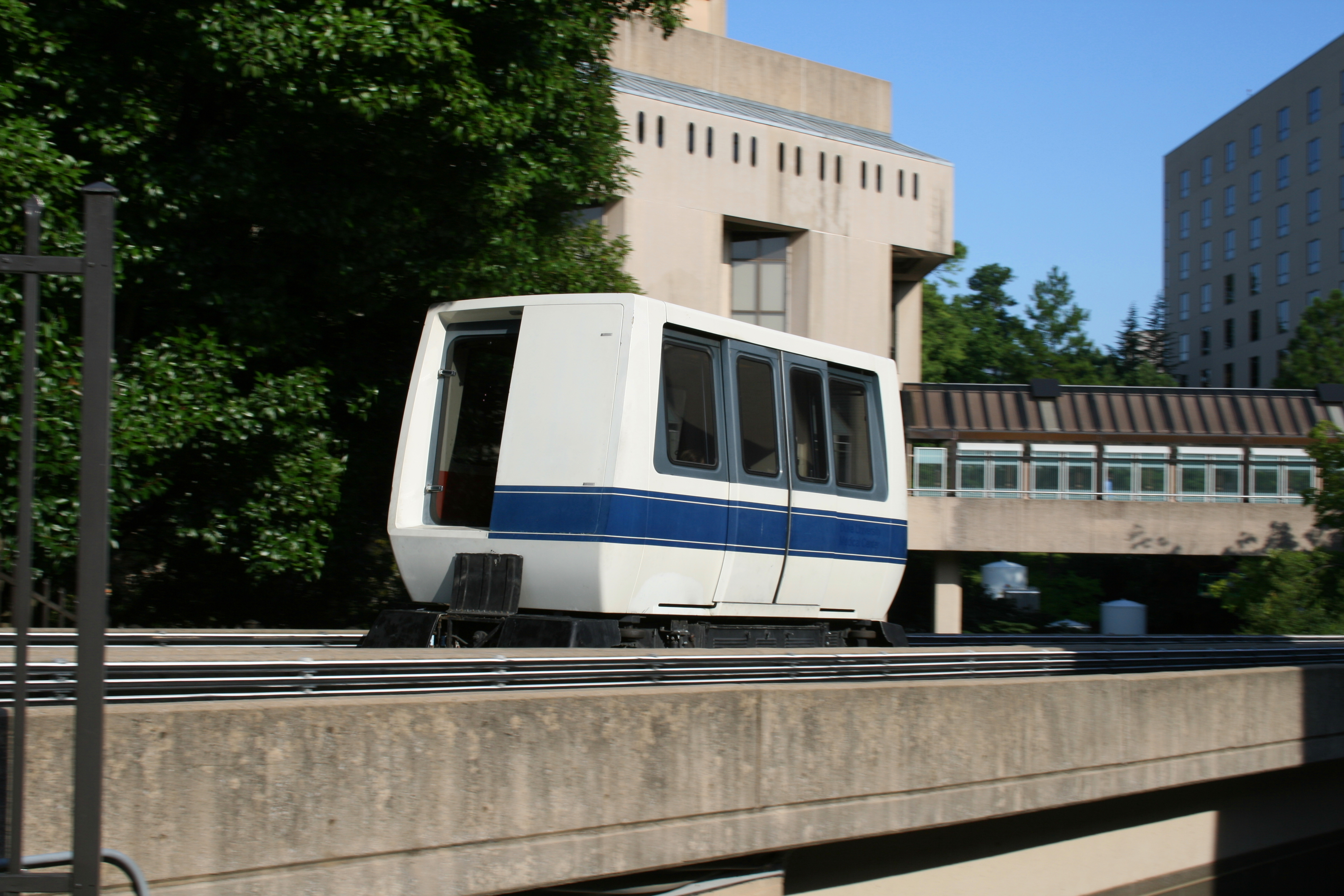
Duke Hospital PRT

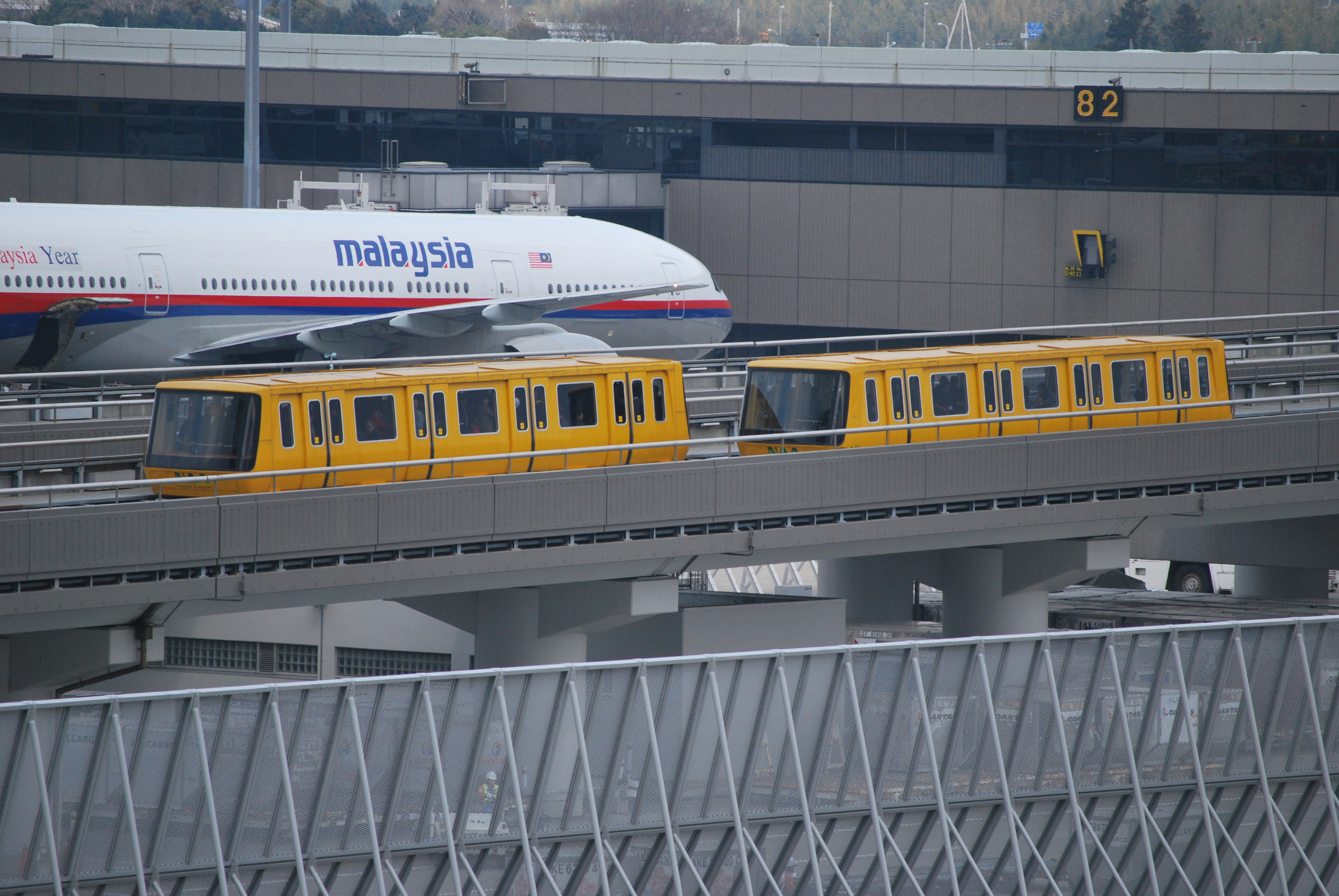
Narita Airport Terminal 2 Shuttle System

A hovertrain, also known as tracked hovercraft (UK) or tracked air-cushion vehicle (US), is a vehicle that is suspended on a cushion of air, similar to a hovercraft, but operates on a guideway. Unlike conventional trains, which use steel wheels on steel rails, hovertrains use air-based lifting systems and a smooth paved surface known as the track or guideway. The concept aims to eliminate rolling resistance and allow very high performance, while also simplifying the infrastructure needed to lay new lines. The first hovertrain was developed by Jean Bertin in the early 1960s in France, where they were marketed as the Aérotrain before being abandoned by the French government.

== History ==
Hovertrains were seen as a relatively low-risk and low-cost way to develop high-speed inter-city train service, in an era when conventional rail seemed stuck to speeds around 140 mph (230 km/h) or less. By the late 1960s, major development efforts were underway in France, the UK and the USA. While they were being developed, British Rail was running an extensive study of the problems being seen at high speeds on conventional rails. This led to a series of new high-speed train designs in the 1970s, starting with their own APT. Although the hovertrains still had reduced infrastructure costs compared to the APT and similar designs like the TGV, in practice this was offset by their need for entirely new lines. Conventional wheeled trains could run at low speed on existing lines, greatly reducing capital expenditures in urban areas. Interest in hovertrains waned, and major development had ended by the mid-1970s.

Hovertrains were also developed for smaller systems, including personal rapid transit systems that were a hot topic in the late 1960s and early 1970s. In this role their ability to float over small imperfections and debris on the "rails" was a practical advantage, although it competed with the maglev concept that had the same advantages. The only hovertain to see commercial service was the Otis Hovair system. Originally developed at General Motors as an automated guideway transit system, GM was forced to divest the design as part of an antitrust ruling. The design eventually ended up at Otis Elevator who later replaced its linear motor with a cable pull and sold the resulting design for people mover installations all over the world.

== Basic concept ==
It was noticed early on that the energy needed to lift a hovercraft was directly related to the smoothness of the surface it traveled on. This was not surprising; the air trapped under the hovercraft's skirt will remain there except where it leaks out around the bottom of the skirt where it contacts the ground – if this interface is smooth, the amount of leaked air will be low. What was surprising was that the amount of energy lost through this process could be lower than steel wheeled vehicles, at least at high speeds.

At high speeds, trains suffer from a form of instability known as "hunting oscillation" that forces the flanges on the sides of the wheels to hit the sides of the rails, as if they were rounding a tight bend. At speeds of 140 mph (230 km/h) or over, the frequency of these hits increased to the point where they became a major form of drag, dramatically increasing rolling resistance and potentially causing a derailment. That meant that for travel above some critical speed, a hovercraft could be more efficient than a wheeled vehicle of the same weight.

Better yet, such a vehicle would also retain all of the positive qualities of a hovercraft. Small imperfections in the surface would have no effect on the ride quality, so the complexity of the suspension system could be reduced. Additionally, since the load is spread out over the surface of the lifting pads, often the entire underside of the vehicle, the pressure on the running surface is greatly reduced – about 1/10,000 the pressure of a train wheel, about 1/20 of the pressure of a tire on a road.

These two properties meant that the running surface could be considerably simpler than the surface needed to support the same vehicle on wheels; hovertrains could be supported on surfaces similar to existing light-duty roadways, instead of the much more complex and expensive railbeds needed for conventional trains. This could dramatically reduce infrastructure capital costs of building new lines and offer a path to widespread use of high-speed trains.

== Development ==
=== Early efforts ===
One of the earliest hovertrain concepts predates hovercraft by decades; in the early 1930s Andrew Kucher, an engineer at Ford, came up with the idea of using compressed air to provide lift as a form of lubrication. This led to the Levapad concept, where compressed air was blown out of small metal disks, shaped much like a poppet valve. The Levapad required extremely flat surfaces to work on, either metal plates, or as originally intended, the very smooth concrete of a factory floor. Kucher eventually became VP in charge of the Ford Scientific Laboratory, continuing development of the Levapad concept throughout.

It does not appear any effort was put into vehicle use until the 1950s, when several efforts used Levapad-like arrangements running on conventional rails as a way to avoid the hunting problems and provide high-speed service. A 1958 article in Modern Mechanix is one of the first popular introductions of the Levapad concept. The article focuses on cars, based on Ford's prototype "Glideair" vehicle, but quotes Kucher noting "We look upon Glideair as a new form of high-speed land transportation, probably in the field of rail surface travel, for fast trips of distances of up to about 1,000 miles [1,600 km]". A 1960 Popular Mechanics article notes a number of different groups proposing a hovertrain concept.

What was lacking from all of them was a suitable way to move the vehicles forward – since the whole idea of the hovertrain concept was to eliminate any physical contact with the running surface, especially wheels, some sort of contact-less thrust would have to be provided. There were various proposals using air ducted from the lift fans, propeller, or even jet engines, but none of these could approach the efficiency of an electric motor powering a wheel.

=== LIM ===
At about the same time, Eric Laithwaite was building the first practical linear induction motors (LIMs), which, prior to his efforts, had been limited to "toy" systems. A LIM can be built in several different ways, but in its simplest form it consists of an active portion on the vehicle corresponding to the windings on a conventional motor, and a metal plate on the tracks acting as the stator. When the windings are energized, the magnetic field they produce causes an opposite field to be induced in the plate. There is a short delay between field and induced field due to hysteresis.

By carefully timing the energizing of the windings, the fields in the windings and "reaction rail" will be slightly offset due to the hysteresis. That offset results in a net thrust along the reaction rail, allowing the LIM to pull itself along the rail without any physical contact. The LIM concept sparked considerable interest in the transportation world, as it offered a way to make an electric motor with no moving parts and no physical contact, which could greatly reduce maintenance needs.

Laithwaite suggested that the LIM would be a perfect fit for high speed transport, and built a model consisting of a chair mounted on a four-wheeled chassis on rails with a LIM rail running down the middle. After successful demonstrations, he convinced British Rail (BR) to invest in some experimental work using a LIM to power a train on rails using small lift pads similar to the Levipad system for suspension.

=== Momentum drag ===
As the various hovertrain systems were developing, a major energy use issue cropped up. Hovercraft generate lift by providing pressure, as opposed to generating lift due to the momentum of air flowing over an airfoil. The pressure of the air required is a function of the vehicle weight and the size of the lift pad, essentially a measure of overall vehicle density. A non-moving vehicle only loses this air due to leakage around the pads, which can be very low depending on the relative pressure between the pad and the outside atmosphere, and further reduced by introducing a "skirt" to close the gap between the pad and running surface as much as possible.

However, as the vehicle moves another loss mechanism comes into play. This is due to the skin friction between the lift air and the ground below it. Some of the lift air "sticks" to the running surface, and is dragged out from under the pad as it moves. The amount of air that is lost though this mechanism is dependent on vehicle speed, surface roughness and the total area of the lift pads. The vehicle air pumps must supply new pressurized air to make up for these losses. As the vehicle weight and lift pad area is fixed, for a given vehicle design the volume of air that needs to be ingested by the pumps increases with speed.

The problem is that the air is at rest compared to the world, not the vehicle. In order to be used by the air pumps, it must first be brought up to vehicle speed. Similar effects occur with almost all high-speed vehicles: thus the reason for the large and complex air inlets on fighter aircraft, for instance, which slow the air down to speeds that their jet engines can ingest. In the case of a hovertrain design, the air losses at the pads increase with speed, so an increasing amount of air must be ingested and accelerated to compensate. That increasing volume of air is at an increasingly lower speed, relative to the vehicle. The result is a non-linear increase in power dissipated into the lift air.

A study by UK Tracked Hovercraft Ltd. (see below) considered the energy use of a 40-ton 100-passenger hovertrain. At 400 km/h (250 mph) and in a 70 km/h (43 mph) crosswind, they predicted that their hovertrain would require 2,800 kW (3,750 hp) to overcome aerodynamic drag, a figure that compared favourably to any other form of ground transit. However, in order to provide lift, the vehicle would need to ingest air and accelerate it to vehicle speed before pumping it into the lift pads. This produced what they called "momentum drag", accounting for a further 2,100 kW (2,800 hp). The combined 4,900 kW (6,600 hp) was not unheard of, existing freight locomotives of similar power were already in use. However, these locomotives weighed 80 tons, much of it constituted by the voltage control and conversion equipment, whereas the Tracked Hovercraft design was intended to be a very lightweight vehicle. THL's solution was to move this equipment to the trackside, requiring this expensive technology to be distributed all along the line. However the PTACV demonstrated that a 64,000 pounds (29 t), 60 seat vehicle needed only 560 kW (750 hp) at 142 mph (229 km/h) for its air suspension and guidance system. At 431 km/h (268 mph), the French I80 HV (80 seats) reached similar figures.

=== Hovertrains give way to maglev ===
The idea of using magnets to levitate a train had been explored throughout the active period of the hovertrains. At first it was believed this would be impractical; if the system used electromagnets, the control systems that ensured even lift across the vehicle would be prohibitively expensive, and at the time there were no suitably powerful permanent magnets that would be able to lift a train.

As electronics improved, and electrical control systems with them, it became increasingly easy to build an "active track" using electromagnets. By the late 1960s there was renewed interest in the maglev concept, and several study projects were starting in Germany and Japan. Through the same period, Laithwaite had invented a new form of the LIM that provided both lift and forward thrust, and could be built over a passive track like the conventional LIMs. In either case, only magnets in the immediate vicinity of the train would have to be turned on, which appeared to offer much lower overall energy needs than the hovertrain.

In general terms, the maglev simply replaced the hover pads with electromagnets. Removing the motors and fans and replacing the pads with magnets reduced vehicle weight by about 15%. This change meant that the relatively low payload fraction of the hovercraft was greatly increased, theoretically doubling it.

But much more important was that there was no need to ingest and accelerate air to feed into the pads, which eliminated 2,100 kW of load and replaced it by the power needed to operate the magnets. This was estimated to be as little as 40 kW, and had much less dependency on speed. This meant that designs like the Tracked Hovercraft were squeezed between the zero-energy "lift" system of steel-wheeled trains and the low-energy lift system of the maglev, leaving no apparent role that one of those systems didn't better serve.

By the early 1970s, a wide variety of new maglev proposals were being actively worked on around the world. The German government, in particular, was funding several different passive and active systems in order to explore which of the proposed solutions made the most sense. By the mid 1970s, several of these projects had progressed to about the same point as the hovertrains, yet appeared to have none of their disadvantages—high sound levels, blown dirt and higher energy use than initially expected.

=== Newer efforts ===
==== Ground effect train ====
More recently, a Japanese project known as Aero-Train has been built to the extent of several prototypes and a test track. The basic concept is the same as the classic hovertrain, but replaces the active hovercraft system of pumps and lift pads with wings, using the efficient generation of lift from the wing-in-ground-effect.

==== Fultrace ====
Launched in 2007, the Franco-Brazilian initiative Fultrace (an acronym for 'Fast ULtralight TRacked Air-Cushioned Equipment') has produced sketch designs for a high speed (200–350 km/h) inter-city system and a lower speed (50–120 km/h) "U-Trace" system for urban installations. A presentation of the system was made to the 2014 Maglev conference in Rio and in 2015 to government representatives of Brazil and Africa.

== Major development efforts ==
=== Tracked Hovercraft ===
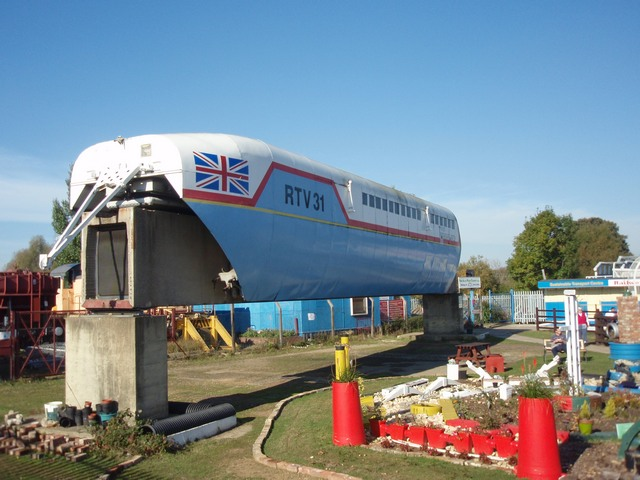
Tracked Hovercraft test system, the RTV 31.

The earliest examples of serious hovertrain proposals come, unsurprisingly, from Christopher Cockerell's group, organized in Hythe, Hampshire as Hovercraft Development Ltd. As early as 1960 their engineers were experimenting with the hovertrain concept, and by 1963 had developed a test-bed system about the size of a tractor-trailer that ran for short distances on a concrete pad with a central vertical surface that provided directional control. The prototype was pushed along its short test track by hand.

The group at Hovercraft Development applied the LIM concept to their hovertrain almost immediately after the LIM became well known around 1961. By the time the prototype was running in 1963, they had been promoting the idea of using a LIM with their suspension as the basis for a full-sized development. A small model of their proposal shows a train that looks like the fuselage of a narrow-body airliner running on a monorail track shaped like an upside-down "T". The horizontal portion provided the running surface, while the vertical provided directional tracking and the structure for mounting the reaction rail.

The team secured some additional funding for the construction of a scale-model system. This was built in the yard of the Hythe site, consisting of a large loop of track about three feet off the ground. By this point the basic layout had changed, with the guideway now in the form of a box girder, with the vertical pads on the sides of the guideway rather than a separate vertical surface on top of it. The vehicle itself was now flatter and wider. This version was running in 1965 and shown publicly the next year at Hovershow '66. A later modification would move the LIM rail from the top to the side of the guideway.

At this point the project entered hiatus for lack of funding. During this same period, British Rail was working on an extensive study project that was suggesting that the hunting problems seen on existing trains could be addressed through development of suitable suspension systems. BR lost interest in the hovertrain concept, and moved on to their Advanced Passenger Train (APT) efforts shortly thereafter. In the meantime, the Hythe team had no funds for the full-scale test system they were proposing, and complained at Hovershow that the French would be taking the lead in hovertrain development.

In 1967, the government handed control of Hovercraft Development to the National Physical Laboratory. At almost exactly the same time, Laithwaite severed his ties with BR. The two teams joined forces, re-organizing as Tracked Hovercraft to continue efforts to build a full-scale prototype. A combination of factors, including Laithwaite's persuasiveness and Bertin's successes in France, quickly gained the company government funding.

Construction of a test track started near Earith, Cambridgeshire in 1970. The location was chosen in a flat area that could allow up to 20 miles (32 km) of track to be laid, although funds only covered the first 4-mile (6.4 km) section. Rising costs further limited this to a short 1-mile (1.6 km) section. The prototype vehicle, RTV 31, started speed tests in 1973, in February it managed to reach 104 mph (167 km/h) in a 20 mph (32 km/h) headwind.

In spite of this success, two weeks later the government cancelled further funding. A combination of the total lack of interest on BR's part, and infighting between the various high-speed efforts, prompted the formation of an independent review board that heavily favored APT. The test track was later removed and RTV 31 ended up in the Peterborough Railworld Wildlife Haven where it is currently awaiting restoration.

=== Aérotrain ===
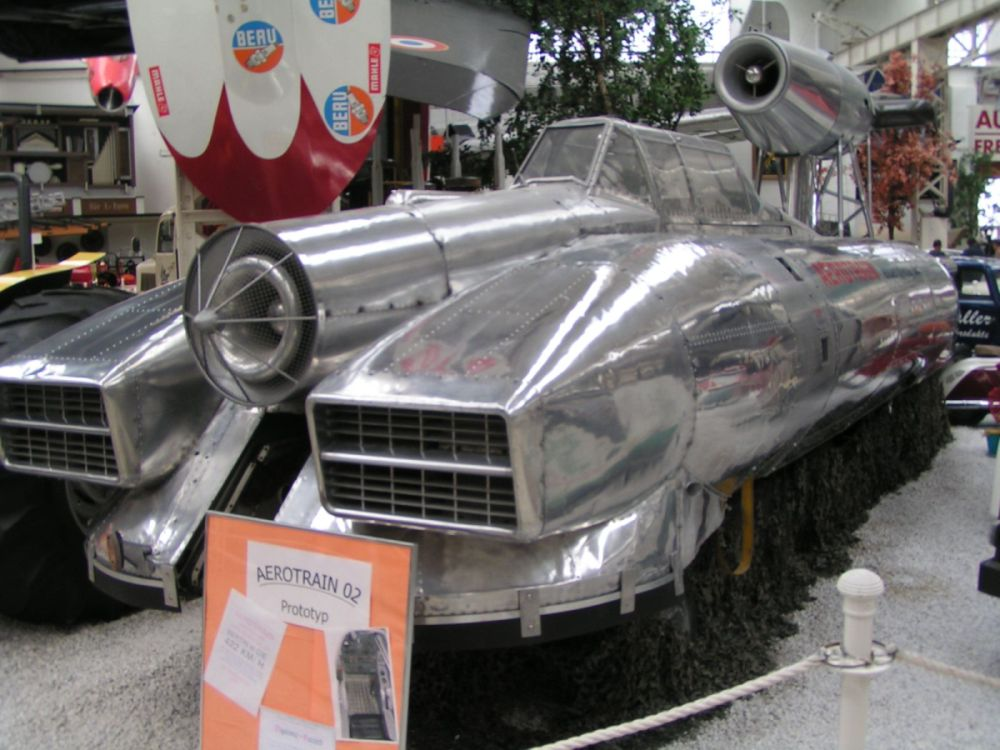
Aérotrain prototype #02

Jean Bertin was an early advocate of the hovercraft, and had built a series of multi-skirt transport vehicles for the French army known as the "Terraplane" in the early 1960s. In 1963, he showed a model of a vehicle similar to the early Hovercraft Development concepts to SNCF. Like BR, SNCF was actively exploring high-speed train service. The public demonstration of the Hovercraft Development system appears to have sparked their interest, and they started funding Bertin's efforts to develop what he called the "Aérotrain".

Lacking the engineering know-how in the nascent LIM field, Bertin's early designs used propellers. Through 1964 the team built a 1/2 scale model of a small hovertrain, and a 3 km (2 mi) long track to test it on. On 29 December 1965 the prototype was first placed on its upside-down T-shaped track, and on 26 March 1966 it reached 202 km/h (126 mph). Higher speeds could not be reached with a propeller on the short test track, so the engineers equipped the vehicle with small rockets and in December it reached 303 km/h (188 mph). This success garnered funding for the addition of a Turbomeca Marboré turbojet engine taken from a Fouga Magister, which powered it to 345 km/h (214 mph) on 1 November 1967.

Several newer prototypes of ever-larger size followed, culminating in the I-80, a 44-seat vehicle powered by two turboshaft engines driving a single shrouded propeller. An 18 km (11 mi) long test track outside of Chevilly was built to test it, where it arrived on 10 September 1969. Two days later it reached 200 km/h (120 mph), and the day after that 250 km/h (160 mph), its design speed. For additional boost a jet engine was added, powering it to 400 km/h (250 mph) in October 1973, peaking at 430 km/h (270 mph) on 5 March 1974, a world record to this day. At the same time, Bertin started exploring the LIM for a lower-speed suburban vehicle, building a prototype known as the S44.

Like their UK counterparts, the seeds of the Aérotrain's demise were already being sown by their counterparts at the national railway. In 1966, other SNCF engineers had made the first proposals for higher speed conventional railways, a proposal that would take on a life of its own and evolve into the TGV program. Like the Tracked Hovercraft and APT, the Aérotrain project soon found itself fighting with the TGV for future development. Unlike the UK work, however, the Aérotrain had stronger political backing, and did not suffer from the same lack of funding as its British counterpart.

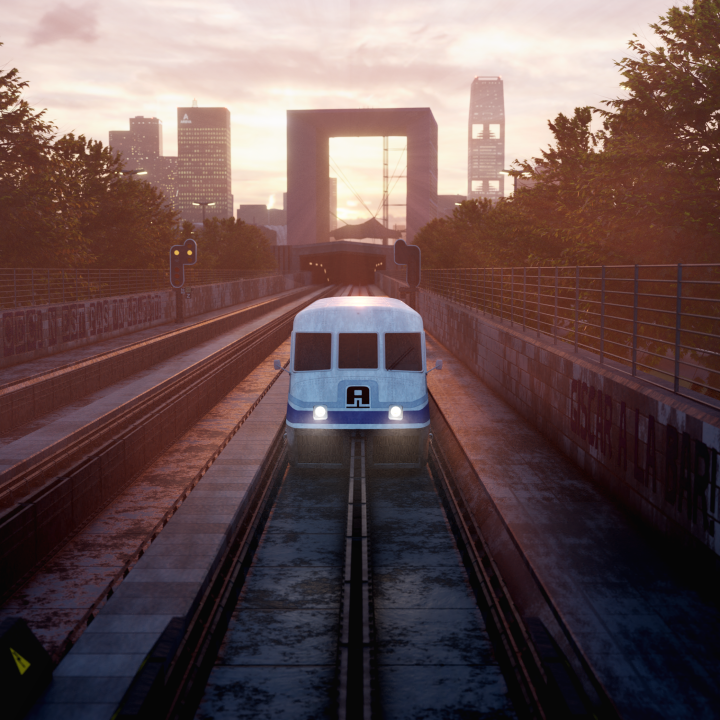
Artist's impression of the La Défense-Cergy Aérotrain line.

Several development proposals were offered and hotly debated both within SNCF and the government. After many proposals, on 21 June 1974 SNCF signed a contract for an Aérotrain line between La Défense and Cergy, on the northwestern side of Paris. On 17 July the contract was annulled. The September 1975 Paris-Lyon TGV line was the deathblow to the project, although small-scale work continued until 1977.

=== Transrapid ===
During the early 1970s, it was not clear whether the hovertrain or maglev would eventually win the technology race. Krauss-Maffei, primary developer of the Transrapid and Transurban maglev trains, decided to hedge their bets and develop a hovertrain prototype of their own. The Transrapid03 was first tested in the summer of 1972, but by this time the maglev had proven itself and further work ended the next year.

=== TACV ===
As part of the High Speed Ground Transportation Act of 1965, the Federal Railway Administration (FRA) received funds to develop a series of high-speed trains. In addition to funding development of the successful UAC TurboTrain and more conventional projects, the FRA also took out licenses on Bertin's designs and started efforts to build several prototype vehicles under the Tracked Air Cushion Vehicle (TACV) program. TACV envisioned a LIM powered hovertrain with 300 mph (483 km/h) performance. Different elements of the technology were to be tested with different prototypes.

In December 1969, the DOT selected and purchased a large parcel of land outside Pueblo, Colorado, and built the High Speed Ground Test Center (HSGTC) for the various programs. For the TACV program, DOT paid for the construction of the test track loops for the different prototypes. However, track construction proceeded slowly.

==== LIMRV ====
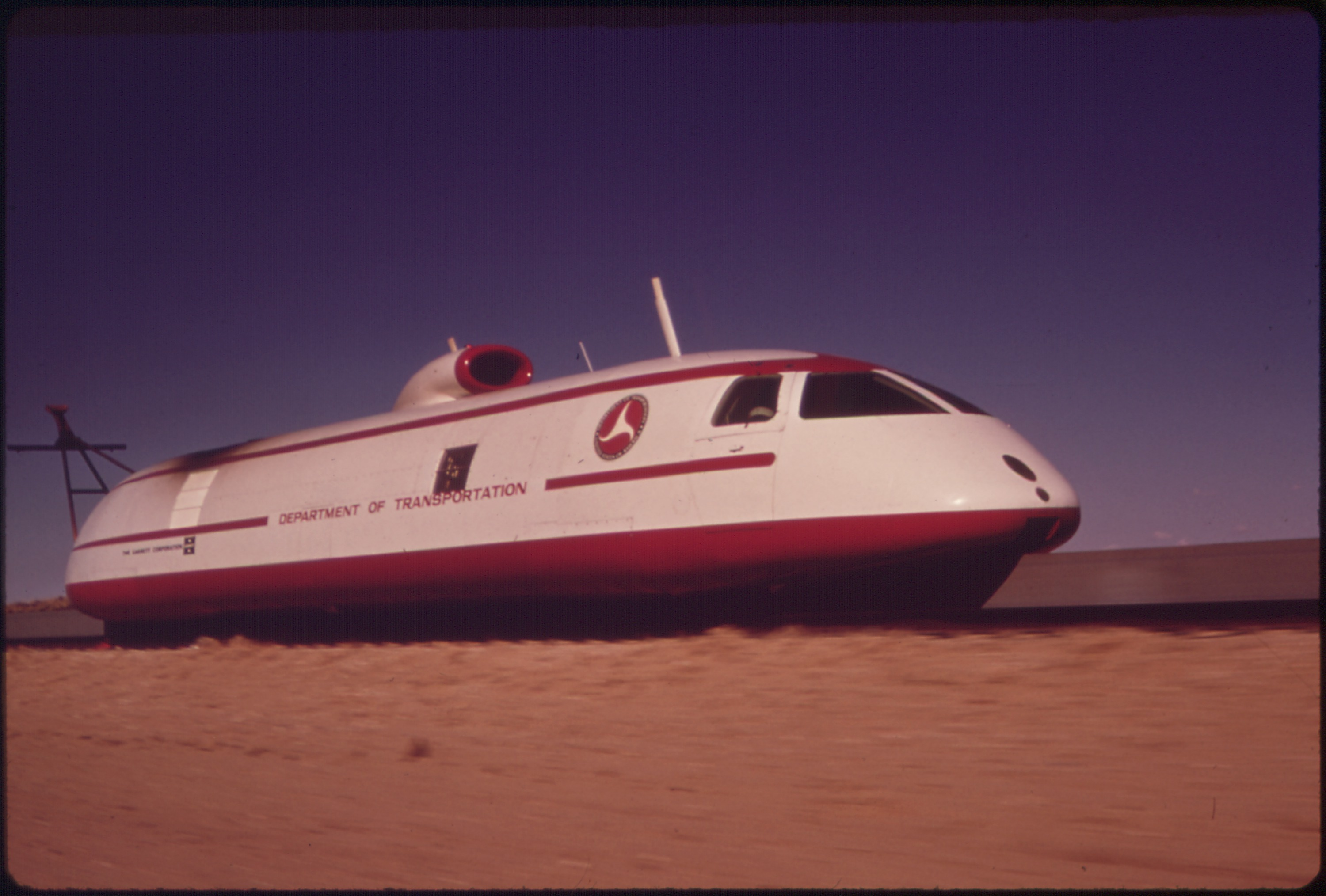
LIMRV before J52 jet engines were added

Since the Bertin team had not yet used a LIM, the first part of the TACV program was dedicated to LIM development. Garrett AiResearch built the Linear Induction Motor Research Vehicle (LIMRV), a wheeled vehicle running on standard-gauge railroad track, fitted with a 3,000 hp (2,200 kW) gas turbine generator to supply the LIM with electricity.

The test track for the LIMRV at the HSGTC near Pueblo wasn't yet complete when Garrett delivered the vehicle: the reaction rail in the middle of the tracks was still being installed. Once the track was ready, linear induction motor, vehicle power systems, and rail dynamics testing progressed and by October 1972, a speed of 187.9 mph (302.4 km/h) was achieved. Speed was limited due to the length of track (6.4 mi or 10.3 km) and vehicle acceleration rates. Two Pratt & Whitney J52 jet engines were added to the vehicle to propel the vehicle up to higher speeds, after acceleration the engines were then throttled back so that the thrust equaled their drag. On 14 August 1974, the LIMRV achieved a world record speed of 255.7 mph (411.5 km/h) for vehicles on conventional rail.

==== TACRV ====
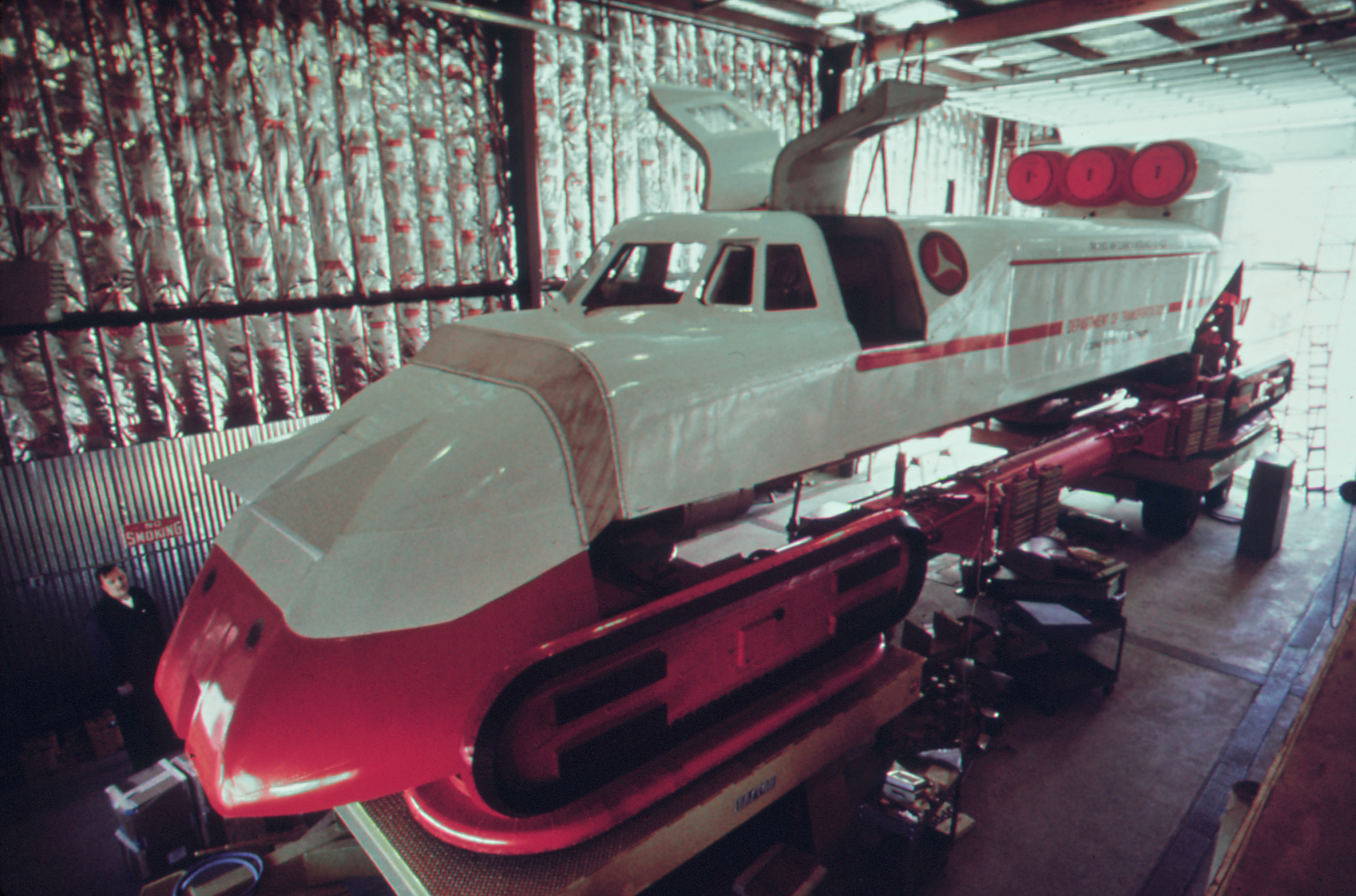
TACRV

The second stage of the TACV project was a hovercraft testbed initially powered by turbofan engines, the Tracked Air Cushion Research Vehicle (TACRV). Boeing and Grumman proposed designs, with the Grumman vehicle being given the go-ahead. Grumman's TACRV was presented in 1972. Although Grumman's efforts got the majority of the funding in the TACV project, ensuring the construction of 22 miles (35 km) of track, the reaction rails for the LIM propulsion were never installed. With jet engine propulsion only, no more than 90 mph (145 km/h) was achieved.

==== UTACV ====
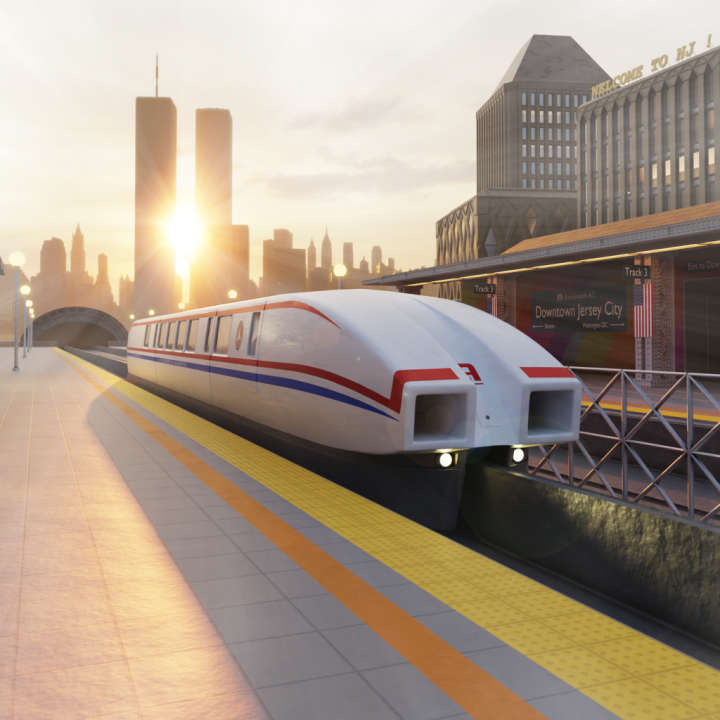
Artist's impression of a Rohr UTACV

The third stage of the TACV project was a complete LIM-powered hovertrain with passenger seating, the Urban Tracked Air Cushion Vehicle (UTACV). Rohr Industries won the contract with a design based on Bertin's Aérotrain, and delivered the prototype to HSGTC in Pueblo in 1974.

However, there was almost no money left over, so the Rohr vehicle received only 1.5 miles (2.4 km) of track, on which a maximum of only 145 mph (233 km/h) was possible. By the time the UTACV was ready for testing, most of the budget had already been used up, and no further funds were forthcoming. The need for an electricity supply system, low energy efficiency, and noise levels were seen as problems. The last tests of the Rohr vehicle ended in October 1975. Since then the Pueblo facility has been used for testing conventional rail vehicles, and is now known as the Transportation Technology Center.

==== Current status ====
Currently all three vehicles are on display at the Pueblo Railway Foundation's workshop.

== See also ==
- Hovercar
- Hovercraft Museum

== Bibliography ==
- Scott, David (November 1961). "Straight-Line Electric Motor Promises 200-m.p.h Train". Popular Science: 76–78, 200–201.
- Volpe, John (December 1969). "Streamliners Without Wheels". Popular Science: 51–55, 184.
- Linkletter, John (June 1960). "GM Editor Rides the Air Cars". Popular Mechanics: 91–96, 228, 252, 254.
- Hope, Richard (15 February 1973). "Dropping the tracked hovercraft". New Scientist: 358–360.
- "PTACV Marketing Survey Report And System Summary - Part III" (PDF). Rohr Industries. June 1976. pp. III-11. Archived from the original (PDF) on 3 April 2015.
