= Sharon Feingold =

American voice actress

Sharon Feingold is an American voice actress, screenwriter, businesswoman, and filmmaker.

== Biography ==
=== Early life and education ===
Feingold was born & raised in Atlanta, Georgia. She attended George Washington University in Washington, D.C. for her undergraduate education. She then earned her MBA from Georgia State University in Atlanta.

=== Career ===
Feingold is the brand voice for HGTV and Food Network Asia and can be heard in promos for shows such as Fixer Upper, Property Brothers, and House Hunters. She is the voice of the ATL Skytrain and The Plane Train Hartsfield-Jackson Atlanta International Airport, as well as the narration voice of the Incline Railway at Chattanooga, Tennessee's Lookout Mountain. In May 2010, she appeared as herself on Donald Trump's Celebrity Apprentice as a hired voiceover talent for team Tenacity, appearing alongside Cyndi Lauper, Holly Robinson-Peete and Curtis Stone. She is the voice behind many of Nickelodeon and Nick Jr. Channel's quizzes and recap videos on their digital channels and YouTube. She provides the narration for four streaming on-demand biographies of Jennifer Aniston, Adam Sandler, Joe Biden, and Kamala Harris.

According to her IMDB profile, Feingold voiced the teenage character, Megan, in the animated TV series Mew Mew Power (2003).

Feingold is also a writer/filmmaker of two award-winning short comedies, The Script Re-Right and Emojional Breakdown.

== Personal life ==
Feingold resides in Atlanta. She is Jewish and has one daughter.
