= Automated Guideway Transit System (Denver International Airport) =

People mover system at Denver International Airport

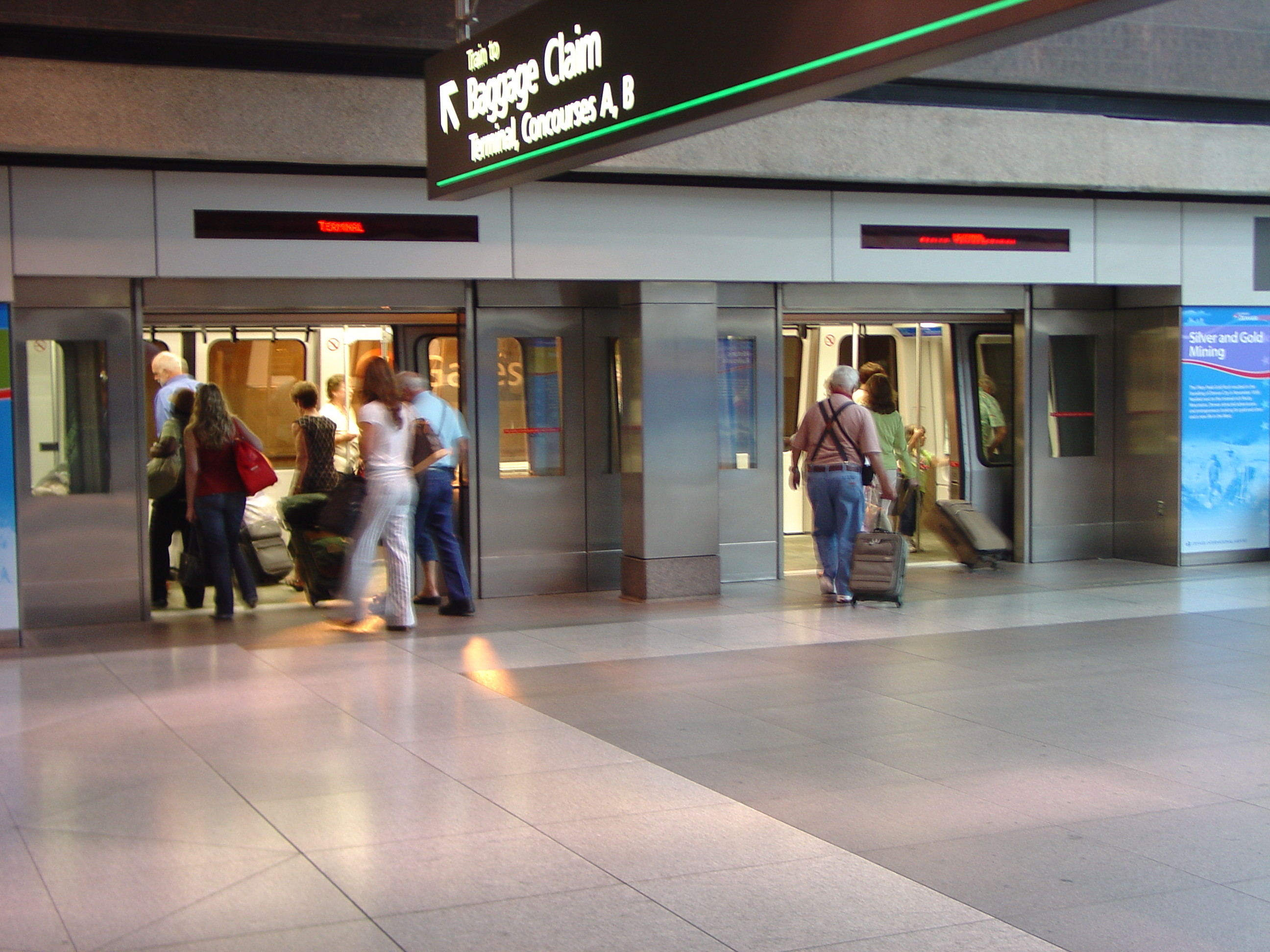
- Passengers boarding at Concourse C in 2008

Overview
- Locale: Denver International Airport, Colorado
- Termini: Jeppesen Terminal; Concourse C
- Stations: 4

Service
- Type: People mover
- Operator(s): City & County of Denver Department of Aviation
- Rolling stock: 31 Innovia APM 100 vehicles

History
- Opened: February 28, 1995

Technical
- Line length: 1.25 mi (2.01 km)
- Character: Fully underground and serves sterile parts of the airport

The Automated Guideway Transit System (AGTS) is a 24/7 people mover system operating within Denver International Airport (DIA). The system opened along with the airport itself in 1995 and efficiently connects the distant concourses with the main terminal (named the Jeppesen Terminal).

== History ==
The AGTS project was announced publicly in October 1992 at a cost of $84 million, and it opened with the airport on February 28, 1995. The initial system consisted of 16 cars that were paired together in groups of four to traverse the length of the tunnel. The vehicles were to ride on rubber wheels along a concrete track. The system was built by AEG Westinghouse, which was acquired by Bombardier Transportation in 2001 and in turn by Alstom in 2021.

Six more vehicles were added to the system by 1996, an additional five were added in 2001, an additional four in 2007, and an additional 26 in 2021 (16 of which are to replace the original vehicles from the airport’s opening and 10 additional vehicles were added to the system). Today, the fleet consists of 41 automated Innovia APM 100 vehicles, each of which has a maximum capacity of 100 passengers.

In late 2023, 26 new vehicles were added to the system. These vehicles were originally scheduled to be delivered by 2021, but due to impacts of the COVID-19 pandemic on manufacturing, the delivery date was delayed to 2024. When the new vehicles have been delivered, the original 16 vehicles from 1995 will be retired from service. The 10 additional new vehicles will bring the total number of vehicles to 41. The new vehicles are based on the Innovia APM 300R platform, which is currently manufactured by Alstom. By 2028, Denver is expected to have all new trains running on the rails, and they will be even faster for passenger traffic.

== Layout and operation ==
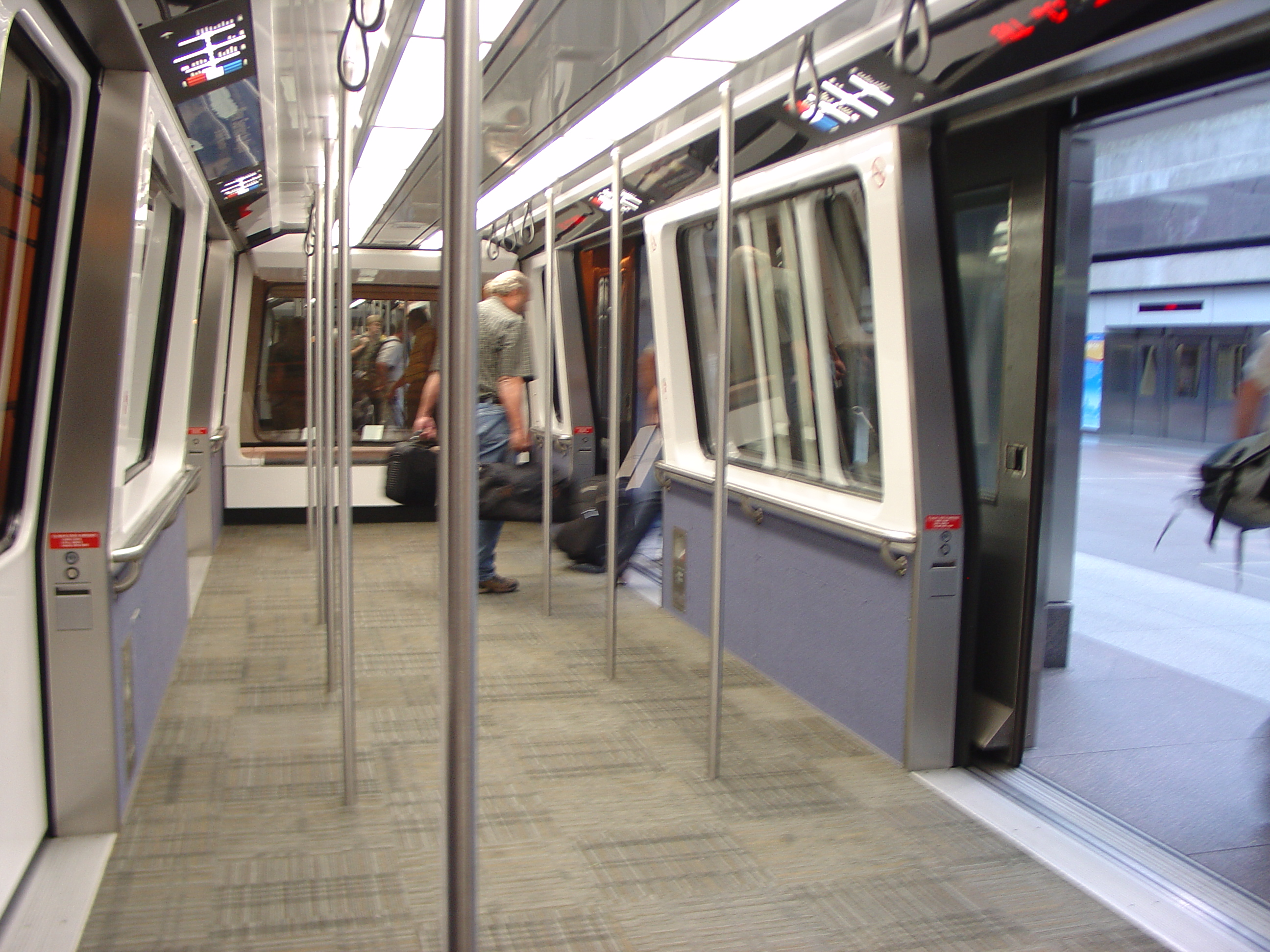
The interior of the vehicles in 2008

Located airside, the AGTS operates bi-directionally in a pinched-loop configuration utilizing twin 1.25 miles (2.01 km) tunnels traveling underneath the aircraft taxiways and passing through the center on the concourse buildings. Four stations exist, serving each airside concourse (Concourses A, B, and C) and the Jeppesen Terminal (which serves check-in, ground transportation and baggage claim). The AGTS is the only way for the departing passengers to access Concourses B and C. The layout of Denver International Airport is heavily based on that of Hartsfield–Jackson Atlanta International Airport with the AGTS being operationally identical to The Plane Train (which was also built by Westinghouse) at that airport.

Trains generally run at 1.5 minute intervals during peak times resulting in an 11-minute travel time from end to end (round trip).

Each concourse station has an island platform between the two tunnels. The Jeppesen Terminal station is configured with the Spanish solution, which includes an island platform for departing passengers but also includes additional side platforms on the outside of each track for arriving passengers. Usually, trains will reverse direction at the Jeppesen Terminal after unloading and loading passengers and switch to the northbound track at a crossover north of the station as it proceeds to the concourses. At busier times, trains arriving at the Jeppesen Terminal will unload passengers and proceed behind the station to switch tunnels before reentering the station on the opposite track to board departing passengers. Crossover tracks exist also between each station for additional flexibility and so traffic can be routed around stalled or disabled trains if necessary. A maintenance facility is located just beyond the Concourse C station, which is also where trains switch tunnels and reverse after unloading passengers at Concourse C.

Late in the evening and overnight, the system is reduced to only one train in operation. The train will simply shuttle back and forth from end to end in one of the tunnels.

== Transit art ==
Nearly one percent of the construction budget for Denver International Airport was dedicated to artwork and art installations. The AGTS is home to three of the airport's art installations.

=== "Train Call" ===
"Train Call" is an audio installation on the AGTS involving the systems station announcements and warning messages. The pre-recorded announcements are delivered by a well-known voice talent from the Denver area and are preceded by a variety of short musical jingles and sound effects. Train Call was recorded by sound artist Jim Green, who intended for the audio to be playful, friendly, and memorable. Green is also known for recording the audio for the singing sinks in the restrooms at the Denver Art Museum, the "Laughing Escalators" at the Denver Convention Center, and the "Musical Warning Beacons" on the baggage carousels at Fort Lauderdale–Hollywood International Airport.

Train Call currently features the voices of former Denver Broncos and Colorado Rockies announcer Alan Roach, and local KUSA-TV anchor Kim Christiansen. The announcements are preceded by western-style electric guitar, organ, and piano sound effects.

In addition to Roach and Christiansen, passengers are welcomed to Denver by a personal greeting from the voice of Mayor Mike Johnston prior to arriving at the terminal and baggage claim station. Former mayors John Hickenlooper, Bill Vidal, and Michael Hancock delivered the welcome message during their respective tenures as mayor of Denver. The welcome greeting has also been delivered by other notable locals during special events, such as in 2014 and 2016 when the Denver Broncos advanced to the Super Bowl, when a recording by Champ Bailey was used, or during the 2014 Winter Olympics, when a recording by skier Lindsey Vonn was used.

Train Call has been updated twice in the airport's history. The original edition of Train Call was also recorded by Jim Green and ran from the airport's opening in 1995 to 2007. It featured the voices of local radio broadcaster Pete Smythe and former KCNC-TV anchor Reynelda Muse, who is notable for being the first woman and first African American to anchor a television news program in Colorado. Some of the sound effects accompanying the original voices were based on western folk songs, such as "She'll Be Coming 'Round the Mountain", "Turkey in the Straw", and "Home on the Range". Green created the original sound effects, which included sounds of chimes and wind instruments, using plumbing pipes and early synthesizers. The original edition of Train Call was mentioned in Lee Child's 2007 novel Bad Luck and Trouble. One of the novel's villains flies into Denver and enjoys the music on the train as he is heading to the terminal.

The original edition of Train Call was retired in 2007. The airport commissioned Jim Green again to record a new edition of Train Call, which featured the voices of Alan Roach and former KUSA-TV anchor Adele Arakawa. Green composed all new sound effects to accompany the 2007 edition. One of the main reasons the airport sought to change the audio was to update outdated wording of the messages, with the most noticeable change being the reference to the concourse stations. The original audio announced "This train is approaching Concourse A", where it now says "We are approaching the station for all 'A' gates." Station signage was also changed to reflect this. Some information regarding baggage claim monitors in the terminal station also caused confusion and needed to be removed from the messages, since the monitors themselves were removed from the station years prior.

Train Call was updated again in 2018 to its current edition. For the current edition, Adele Arakawa's voice was replaced by Kim Christiansen, who was also Arakawa's successor as evening anchor at KUSA-TV. Most of the sound effects from the 2007 edition were reused for the current edition. The airport held an online poll for the public to vote on new voices for the trains and Christiansen was ultimately selected from a group of local female voice talent. The airport had intended to replace Roach's voice as well, but he auditioned again alongside other male voice talent and was selected by the same online poll.

In recent years, the airport authority purchased the rights to Train Call from Jim Green, allowing them to modify the audio without his input. Green died in September 2024.

=== "Kinetic Light Air Curtain" ===
The "Kinetic Light Air Curtain" as a train approaches Concourse C

The east tunnel (used for northbound trains during normal operation) features a visual art installation known as the "Kinetic Light Air Curtain". Designed by Antonette Rosato and William Maxwell, the exhibit includes 5,280 propellers mounted on the wall. The propellers are accented with blue light, and wind from the trains causes some of them to spin as they pass by. The number of propellers represents the number of feet Denver (the Mile-High City) is located above sea level. Also, the total number of blades of all of the propellers combined represents the height of Colorado's tallest fourteener, Mount Elbert, which is 14,440 ft (4.40 km) tall. Contrary to common belief, the propellers do not generate any electricity for the trains or any part of the airport, and are strictly decorative.

=== "Deep Time, Deep Space, A Subterranean Journey" ===
The west tunnel (used for southbound trains during normal operation) contains the exhibit "Deep Time, Deep Space: A Subterranean Journey". Designed by Leni Schwendinger, this art display primarily consists of over 5,000 feet (1,500 m) of colored reflective metal strips arranged into a variety of images. Various other items, sheet metal cut-outs of pick-axes and hammers stand out from the tunnel walls to accent the scenes. The exhibit gradually transitions from displaying examples of older technology to newer space-age technology. The art is illuminated by an advanced lighting system, which is activated by photoelectric sensors which detect passing trains. The overall work is inspired by Colorado's industrial and mining history.

== Failure ==
The train system is essential for the airport to function at its full capacity since it provides the only passenger access to Concourses B and C. Walkways between the concourses were not included in the original design of the airport due to the expected high reliability of the train system and also because they were too costly to build. However, in rare instances of the train system failing unexpectedly, the airport's contingency plan is to deploy a fleet of shuttle buses to transport passengers between the concourses.

One of the earliest system failures took place on April 26, 1998, when a routing cable in the train tunnel was damaged by a loose wheel on one of the trains, cutting the entire system's power. The system was out of service for about seven hours. United Airlines, DEN's largest airline that operates out of Concourses A and B, reported that about 30 percent of their flights and about 5,000 passengers were affected by the failure. The day of the failure is now referred to as "Black Sunday" by airport personnel.

Instances of failure in recent years, including a mechanical failure on August 20, 2021 that caused significant delays, have led the airport authority to again look into the possibility of adding pedestrian walkways to provide redundancy. Following the incident in 2021, a request for information from the private sector was issued by the airport to analyze options that could supplement the train system in the future. By 2023, several companies proposed their ideas to transport passengers but the cost of construction stifled plans from moving forward. However, in May 2026, DIA announced plans to provide pedestrian access to all concourses using parts of existing baggage tunnels, with 2027 construction start and expected completion by 2028 or 2029.

Denver Airport's terminal layout is based on that of Hartsfield Jackson Atlanta International Airport, but a similar failure of the Plane Train at Atlanta does not have as severe an impact on operations because the concourses at Atlanta are connected by walkways.

== Gallery ==
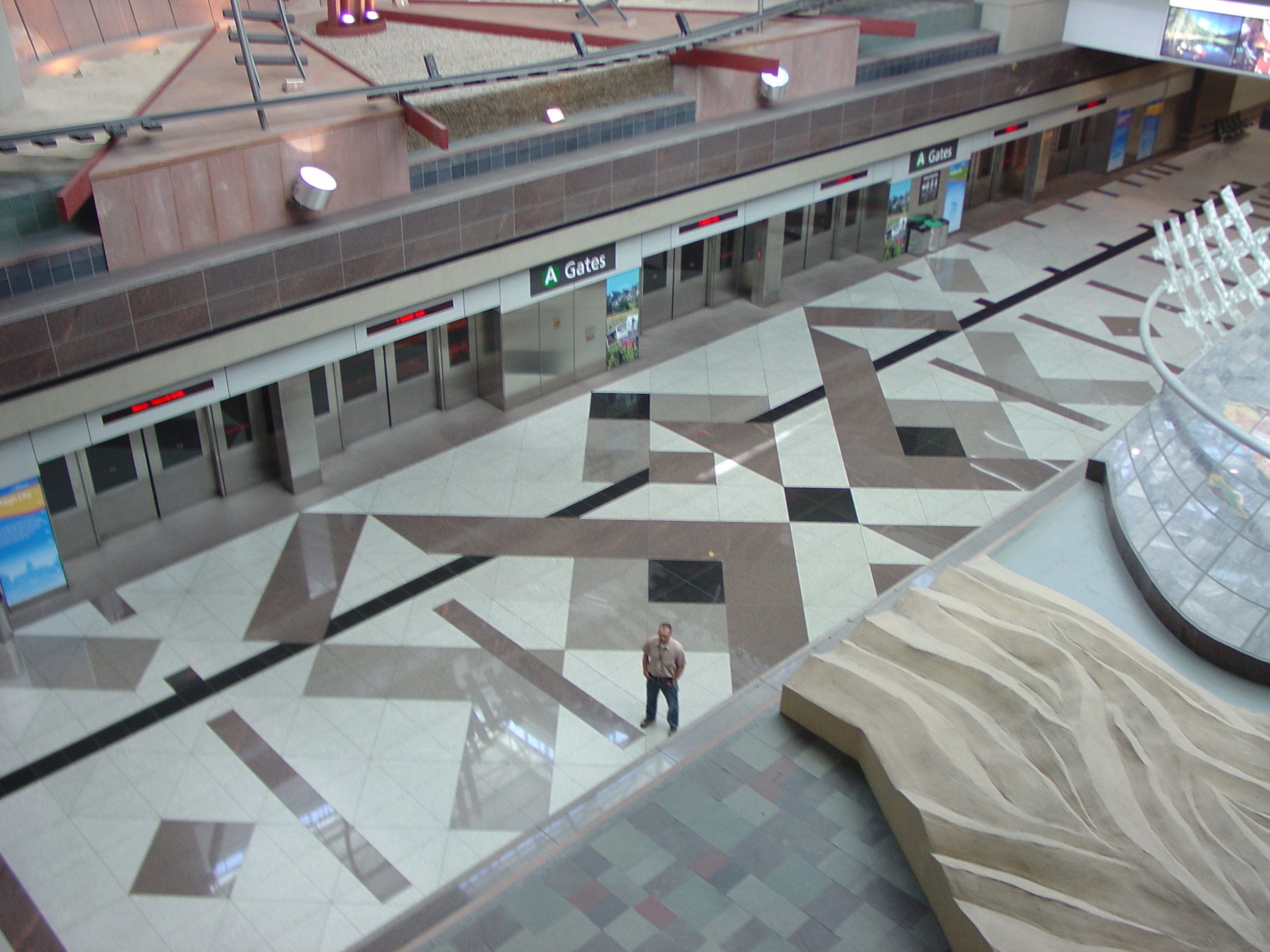
Overhead view of Concourse A Station in 2008

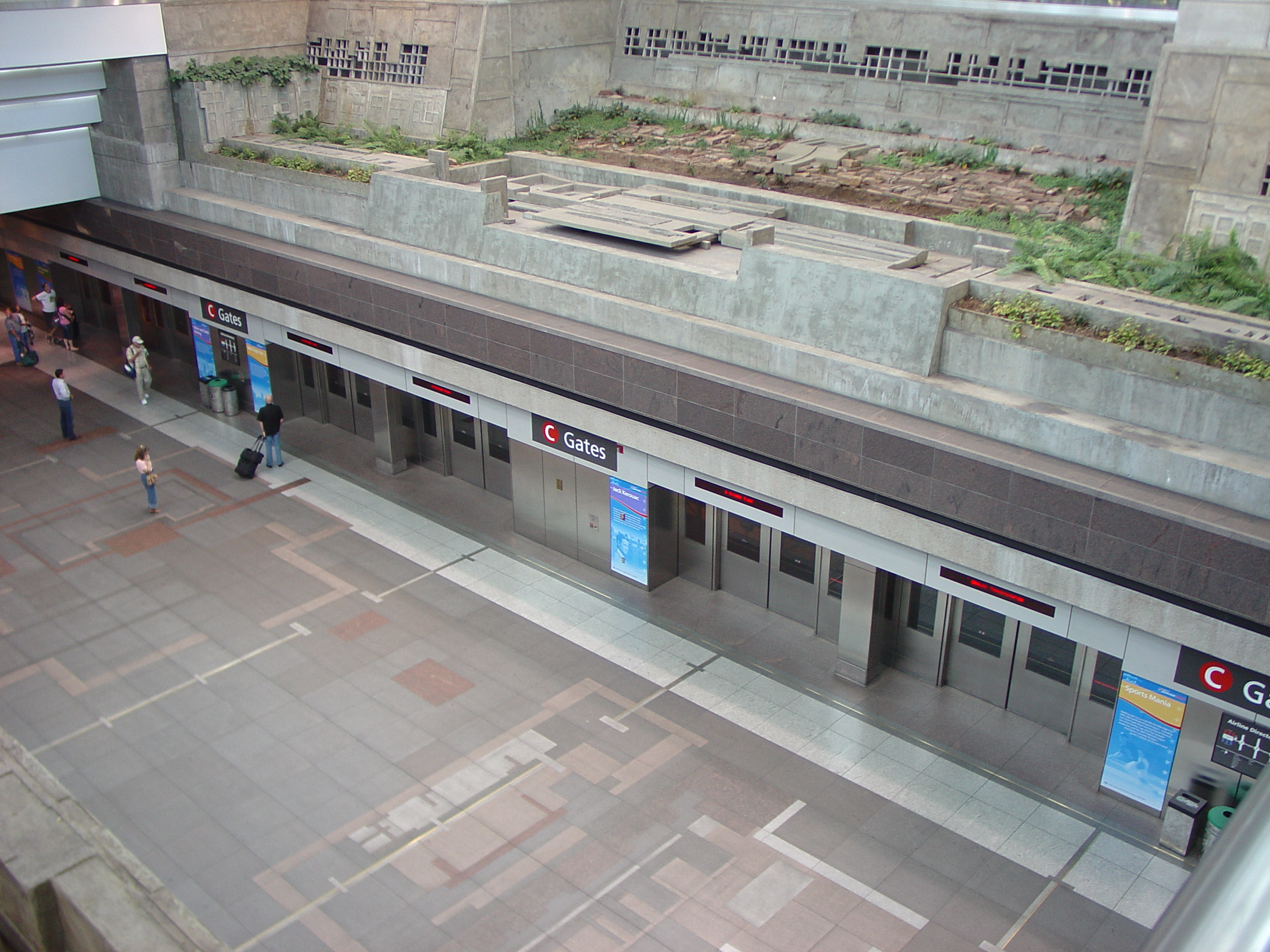
Overhead view of Concourse C Station in 2008

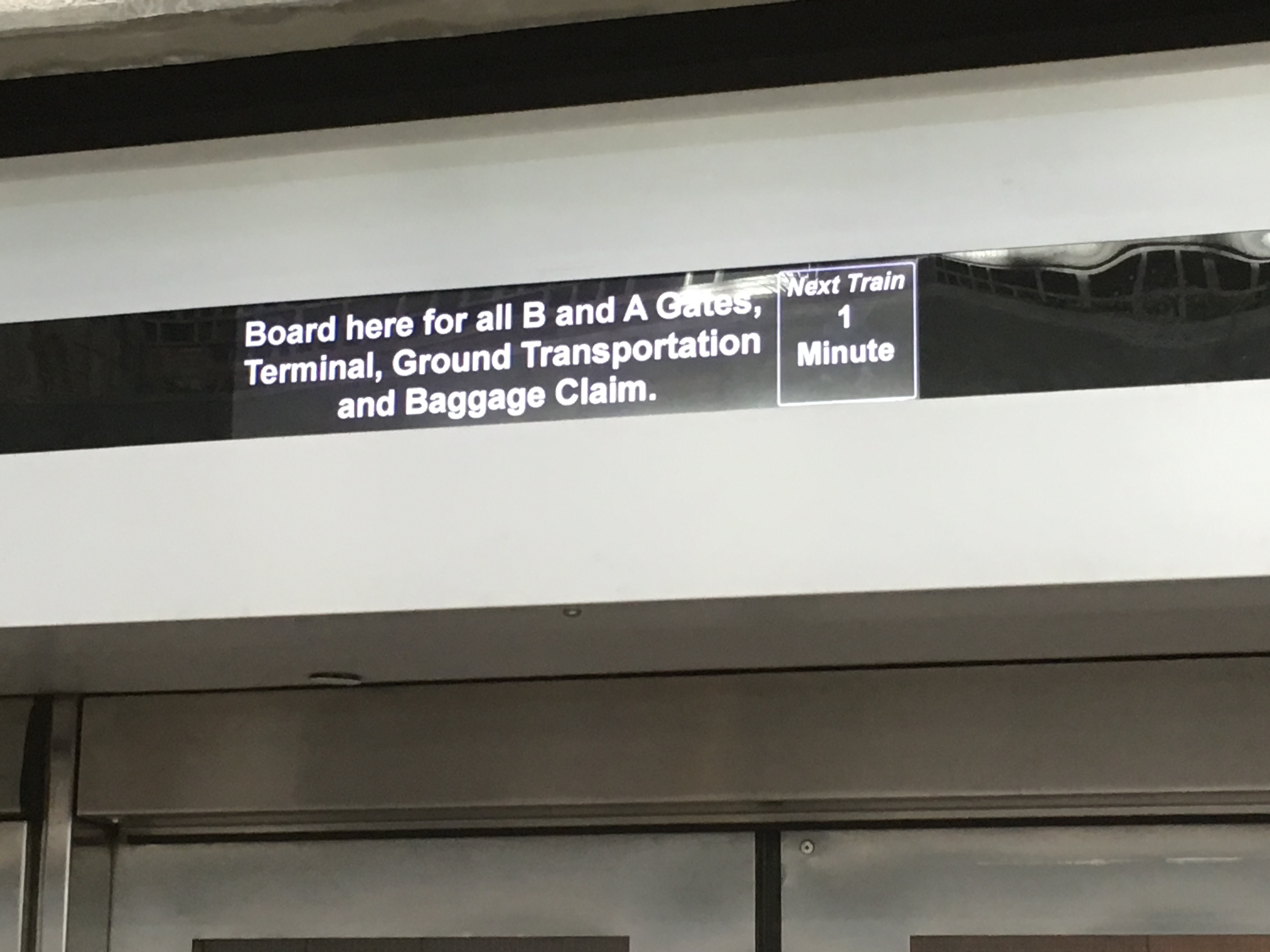
Platform display
