= The Plane Train =

Airside people mover at Hartsfield–Jackson Atlanta International Airport

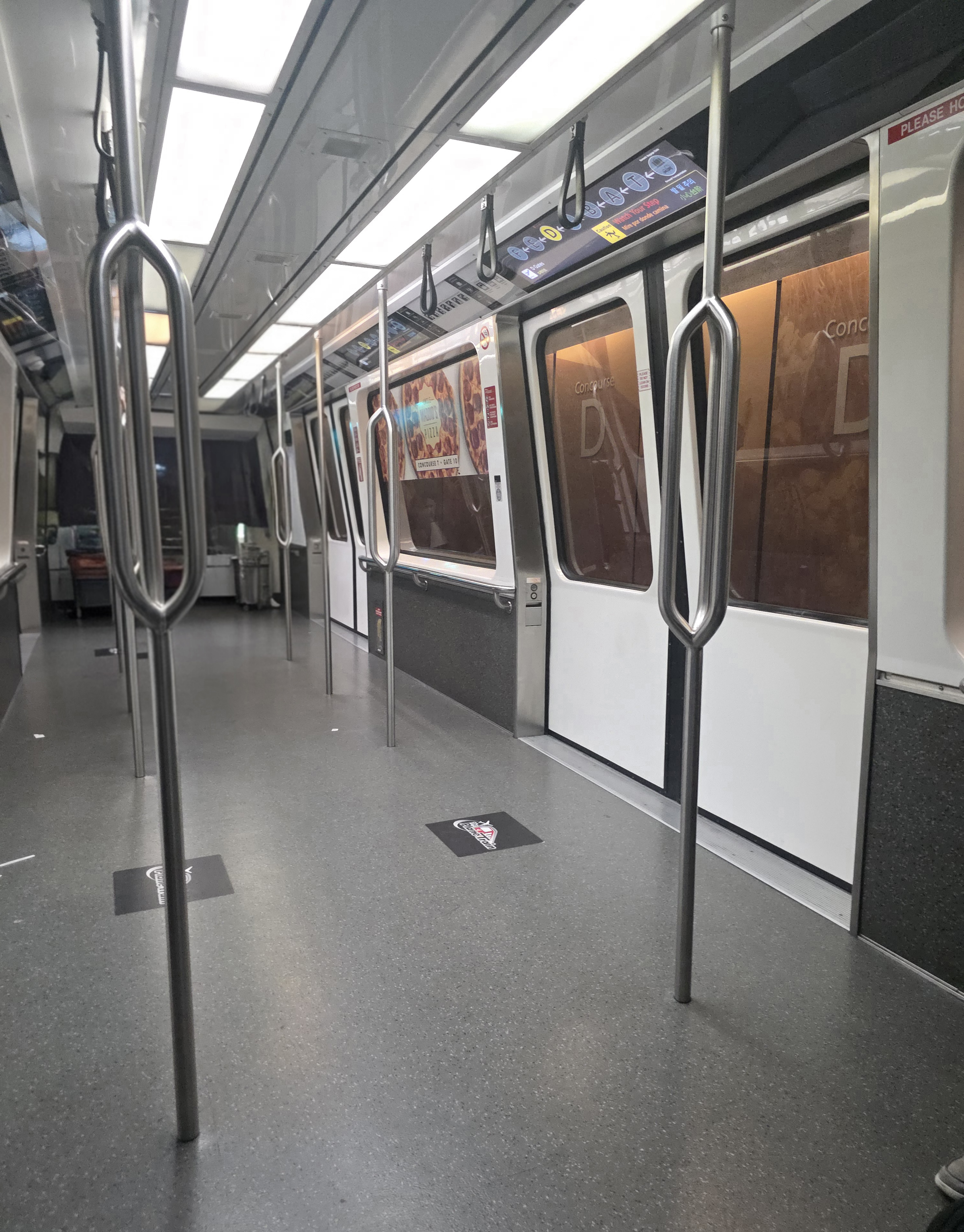
- Interior of a train car

Overview
- Status: Operating
- Owner: Hartsfield–Jackson Atlanta International Airport
- Locale: Hartsfield–Jackson Atlanta International Airport
- Termini: Domestic Terminal; International Terminal
- Stations: 8

Service
- Type: People mover
- Operator: Alstom
- Rolling stock: 11 (4 car sets) × Innovia APM 100
- Daily ridership: 250,000

History
- Opened: September 21, 1980

Technical
- Line length: 2.8 mi (4.5 km)
- Num of tracks: 2
- Character: Fully underground; serves sterile parts of the airport

The Plane Train is an automated people mover system located at Hartsfield–Jackson Atlanta International Airport connecting all of its terminals and concourses. Built by Westinghouse Electric Corporation, the system is the world's most heavily traveled airport people mover. The system is currently operated and maintained by Alstom, which acquired the system's previous operator, Bombardier Transportation, in 2021.

== Ridership ==
Hartsfield–Jackson and news coverage describe the Plane Train as carrying more than 250,000 passengers per day within the airport complex. The airport has described it as the world’s most heavily traveled airport people mover.

== System operation ==
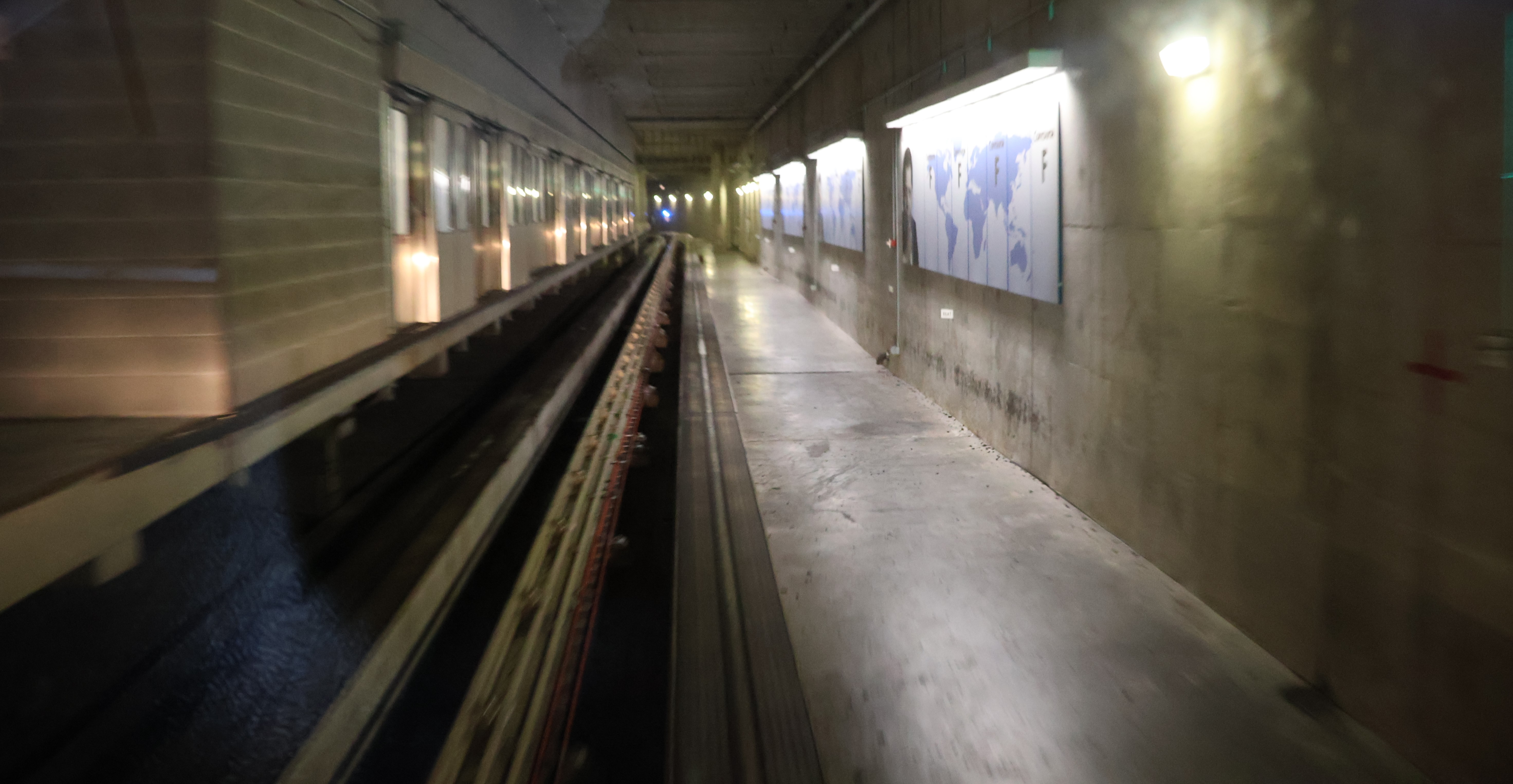
Tunnel near Concourse F

The Plane Train operates in the secure area of the airport connecting the two landside terminals with its seven airside concourses. It exists within the airport's Transportation Mall, which consists of three underground tunnels running through the center of the airport. The trains operate in the two outer tunnels, while the middle tunnel contains an alternative pedestrian pathway with moving walkways.

The system has eight stations: one at each of Concourses A, B, C, D, E and F (International Terminal), and two in the Domestic Terminal—one at Concourse T, which is also the station for passengers from the Domestic Terminal heading to Concourses A–F, and one at the Domestic Baggage Claim and Ground Transportation. The system operates with 11 four-car trains during peak periods.

The Domestic Baggage Claim and Concourses T, E, and F stations have island platforms shared between the two tunnels. The stations for Concourses A, B, C, and D have platforms between the tunnels, though they are not directly across from each other. All platforms have platform screen doors, all of which have a set of red lights that flash alternately to warn that the doors are closing, a feature present since the mid-late 1980s.

During regular service, trains run bi-directionally in the tunnels in a pinched-loop configuration. The east terminus of the line is Concourse F (which also serves the International Terminal) and the west terminus is Domestic Baggage Claim. During peak hours, the trains will stop at each terminus, unload, and then proceed beyond the stations to a cross-over track to return to the opposite side of the platform. During off-peak hours, trains will arrive and depart from a single platform at each terminus and will pass through a cross-over located before the station either before or after stopping at the station. The system has two maintenance workshops: One at Concourse E and another at Concourse F. A third track runs parallel to the two main tracks between Concourses E and F, which connects the two maintenance facilities and is used for testing trains during maintenance.

Since the train operates inside the secure area of the airport, arriving passengers ending their journeys at the International terminal cannot use the train and must instead take a lengthy ground transportation detour around the perimeter of the airport to access facilities such as the car rental center or MARTA station. Departing international passengers entering the International Terminal may use the train to access Concourse E or the other concourses.

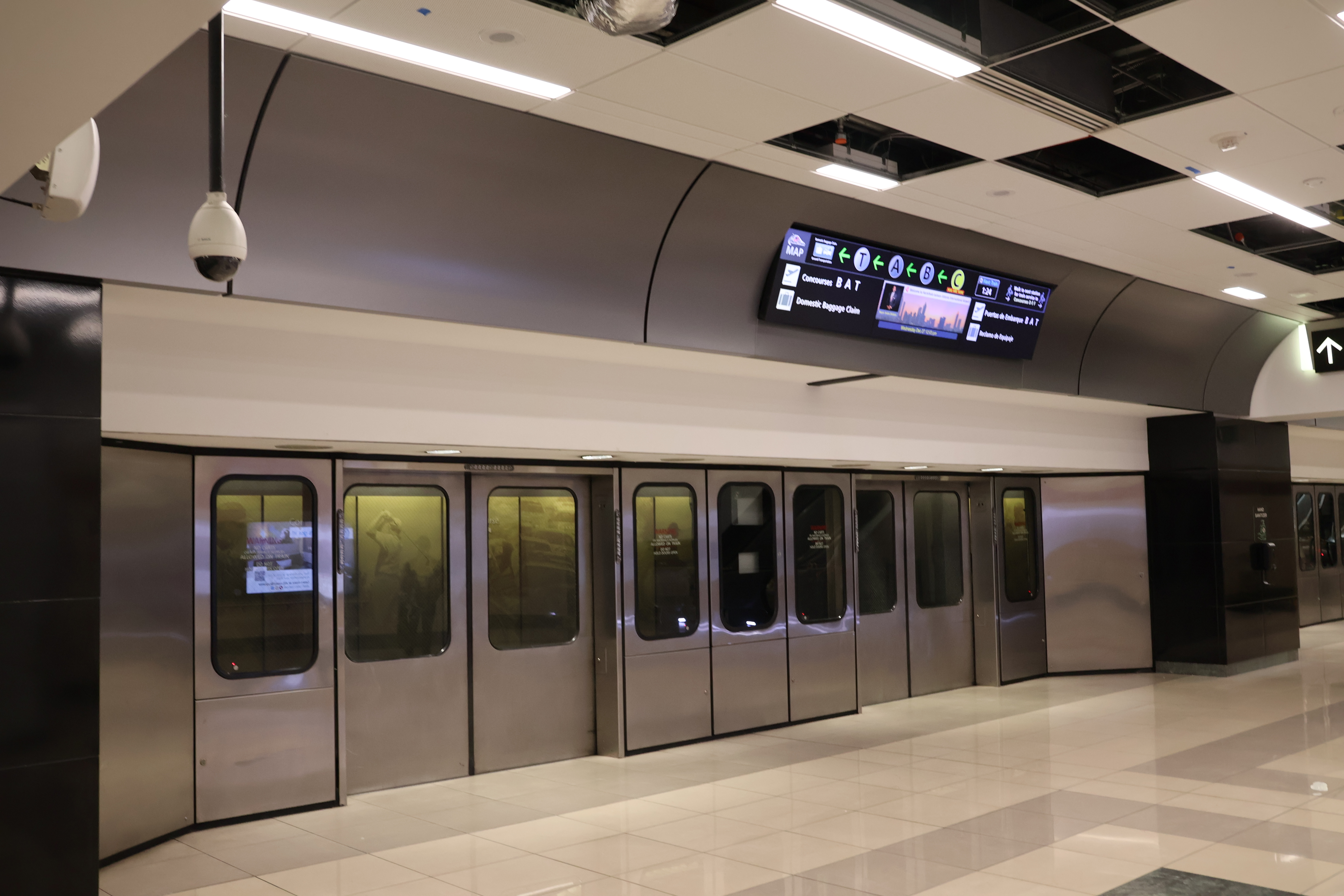
Concourse C westbound platform in 2023

On the platforms and inside the trains, color video displays provide system information in eight languages (English, French, German, Spanish, Japanese, Chinese, Arabic and Korean) as well as information about dining and shopping options in the concourses. Platform displays announce the time of arrival for the next train and its destination.

Audible announcements deliver station information and warn passengers of the train's movements. The messages use the NATO phonetic alphabet to identify each Terminal station. For instance, the message announcing Concourse B says:

The next stop is for B Gates. B, as in Bravo.

The one exception to this is Concourse D, which uses the APCO radiotelephony spelling alphabet where "David" is used rather than "Delta" to avoid confusion with Delta Air Lines, which operates its main hub at ATL.

Occasionally, the Plane Train will run in a single-track reduced service mode overnight from 1 a.m. to 5 a.m. The airport usually runs three trains in single-track mode. Two trains will shuttle on one track between the Domestic Terminal and Concourse D with the two trains passing each other via passing sidings near Concourse B. The third train will shuttle on the same track between Concourse D and Concourse F. The remaining trains receive routine maintenance at this time. The only time the train system is shut down is on Wednesday mornings at 1 a.m. during the off-peak time for maintenance of the track. The system began operating overnight in this configuration in 2018, having previously shut down completely each night.

The airport says it takes three shifts with 123 employees to keep the plane train running 24 hours a day. While the trains are self driving, there are always two control operators on duty.

== History ==
=== 1970s: Planning ===
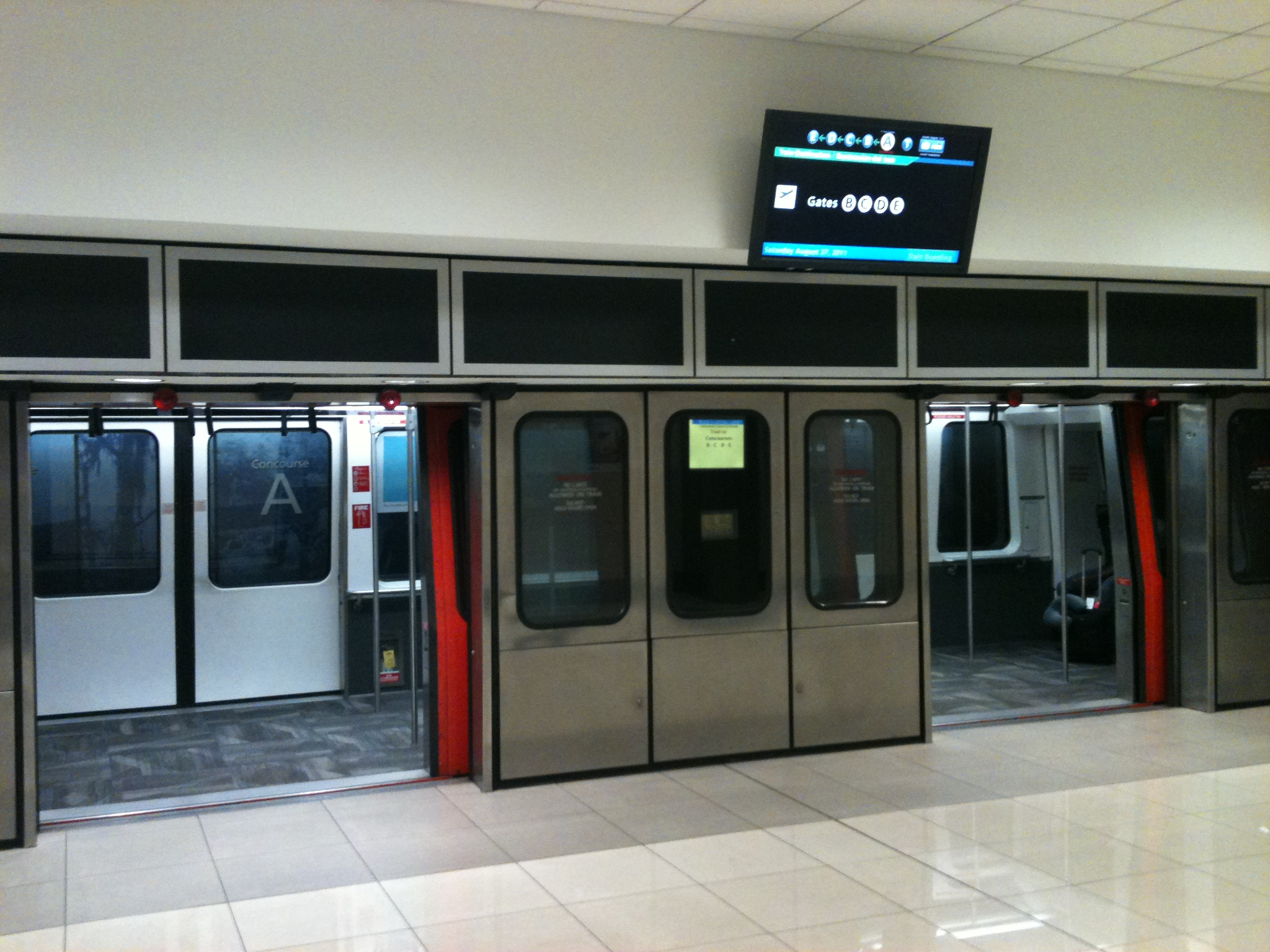
Train at Concourse A in 2011

The airport began planning the current terminal facility in the late 1960s. A people mover system had always been in the plan to transport passengers over the facility's long distances, which included hubs for Delta Air Lines and the now-defunct Eastern Air Lines.

An early design for the terminal included an east–west roadway system through the center of the complex. 16 terminals with perpendicular linear concourses would have existed along both sides of the roadway with an elevated people mover running in a loop connecting the terminals. This design was eventually scrapped since it was more of a benefit to passengers originating in or terminating in Atlanta, and by then nearly 70% of traffic through the airport was connecting from one flight to another.

By 1973, the terminal's design was revised to its current layout, which used a landside/airside design made popular by Tampa International Airport. The people mover would connect the landside concourse with parallel linear airside concourses with a stop at each concourse. Initially, the plan was for the people mover to connect the concourses in an exposed trench similar to the original AirTrans system at Dallas/Fort Worth International Airport (DFW). Bridges over the people mover would have connected the aircraft ramps on either side. In 1975, a winter storm made DFW's system temporarily inoperable. Since Atlanta was vulnerable to similar conditions, the design was changed to have the people mover system fully underground to protect it from the elements. This would also eliminate the need for taxiway bridges.

=== 1980–1994: Opening and early years ===
Construction began on the current terminal facility in 1977. The terminal opened to the public on September 21, 1980, along with the Plane Train (which did not have an official name at the time). The initial system consisted of the six stations from the terminal (now the Domestic Terminal) up to Concourse D. A maintenance facility was built just beyond Concourse D station. The system was built by the Westinghouse Electric Corporation, who supplied the system's initial fleet of C-100 vehicles. It initially operated with six trains in both two and three-car configurations. By 1983, all trains were operating with three cars. The layout of the current terminal was so well received, it was largely replicated at Denver International Airport in 1995 with Westinghouse installing a nearly identical people mover system there as well.

In 1991, Concourse C closed temporarily after Eastern Air Lines ceased operations. For part of the closure, trains skipped Concourse C station. Concourse C reopened in 1992.

=== 1994–2000s: Extension to Concourse E and new vehicles ===
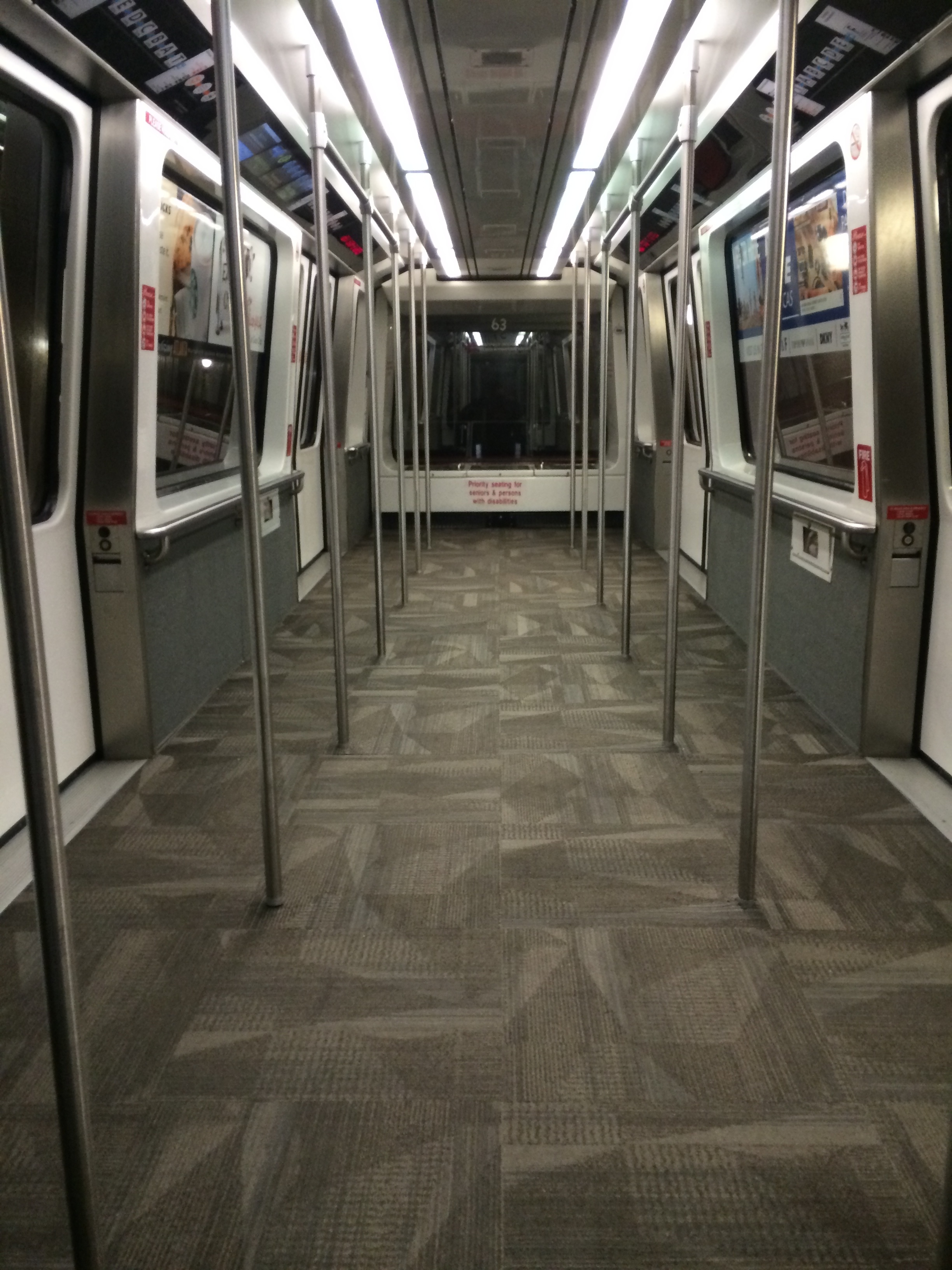
The 2011–2020 interior of one of the original C-100 vehicles in 2014

In 1994, the airport opened Concourse E for international flights in preparation for the 1996 Summer Olympics, which were held in Atlanta. As part of the expansion, the system was extended with a station for Concourse E. The extension also included new maintenance facility to replace the original, which had to be relocated to make room for the Concourse E station.

In 1996, the trains lengthened from three cars to four and large LED displays capable of showing eastern Asian CJK characters were added inside the vehicles to complement the original English text-only dot-matrix red-LED displays in preparation for more international flights.

In between 1997 and 2001, Bombardier Transportation, who had recently acquired the remains of Westinghouse's transportation division after buying out Adtranz, replaced some of the system's original C-100 vehicles with new CX-100 vehicles. Two of the system's original vehicles (cars #1 and #53) were then donated to the Southeastern Railway Museum in nearby Duluth, Georgia, where they are currently on display.

=== 2010s–present: Official name and extension to Concourse F ===
In 2009, a second people mover, the ATL Skytrain, opened on the landside of the airport connecting the Domestic Terminal with the rental car center and the Georgia International Convention Center. With both the ATL Skytrain having an official name and the trend of other airports naming their people mover systems, the airport's communications team launched a "Name the Train" contest on April 1, 2010, to name the airside people mover. The four-week competition was held on Facebook and YouTube with participants submitting entries as comments to a behind-the-scenes video about the airport's automated people mover system. The winning entry was announced on April 30, 2010, as a comment post on the video. As a result, the airside people mover was officially named the Plane Train.

In 2012, the Maynard Holbrook Jackson, Jr. International Terminal and Concourse F opened along with another extension of the Plane Train. Ten additional vehicles were added to the system to accommodate this expansion, bringing the total number of Innovia APM 100 vehicles in the system's fleet to 59. The airport also recommissioned a few C-100 vehicles to keep more trains running.

In early 2026, the Plane Train tunnel was extended west of the Domestic Baggage Claim station with the addition of the 700-foot (210 m) turn-around track behind the station. This expansion increased capacity to allow up to 15 trains at a time to operate at 1-minute intervals.

== Audio announcements ==
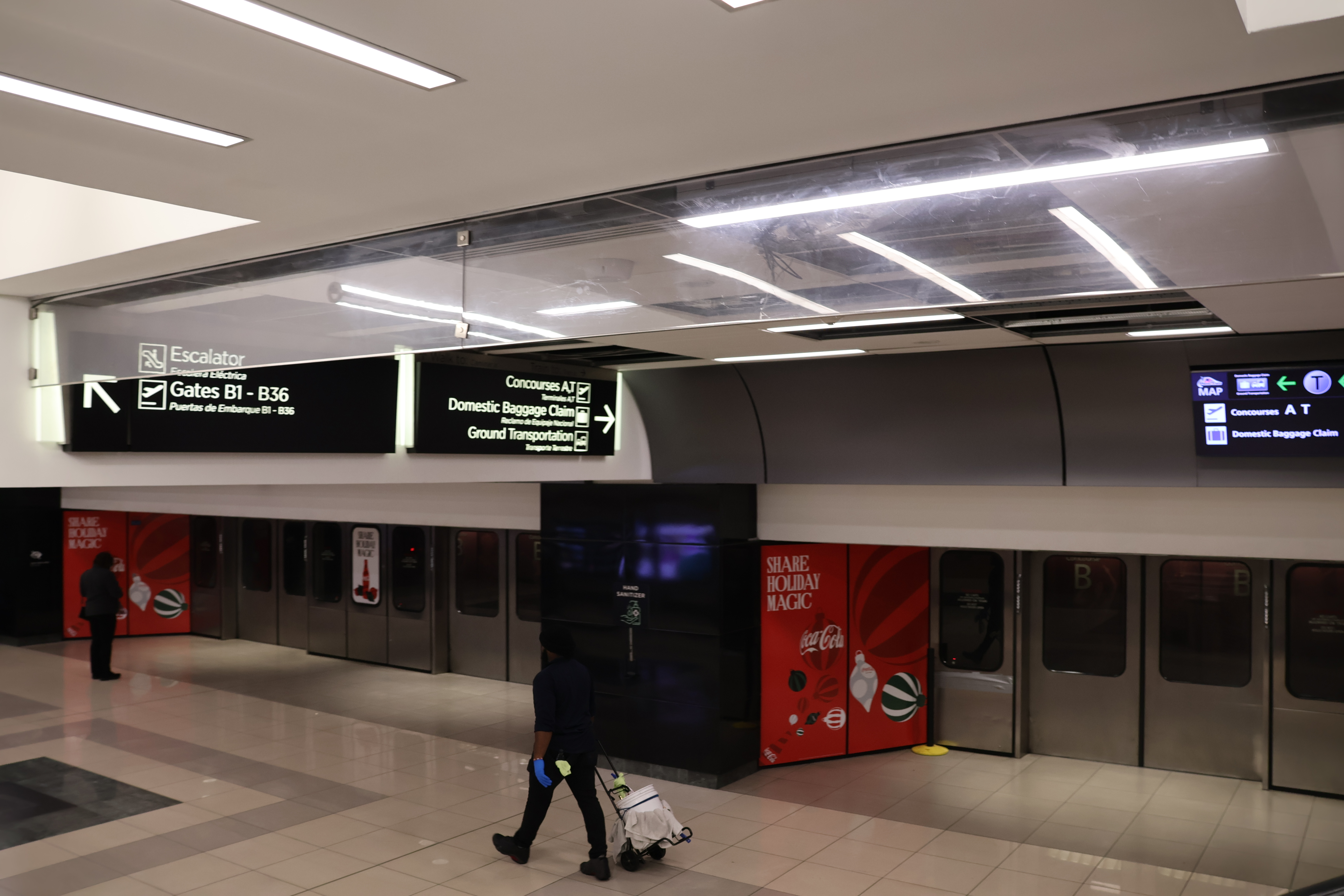
Concourse B platform in 2023

The audio announcements on the Plane Train have been delivered by many voices throughout its history. The first voice on the trains was the voice of local WSB-FM and WQXI radio personality Kelly McCoy. Shortly before the terminal's opening, President Jimmy Carter, a Georgia native, was scheduled to tour the terminal and Westinghouse needed to get announcements recorded quickly to have the system ready for the tour. Westinghouse reached out to McCoy to quickly record the announcements. McCoy's voice remained on the train briefly after the airport opened, though airport officials felt his voice was too friendly and not getting people's attention.

Shortly after opening, McCoy's voice was replaced by a monotone synthesized voice. Airport officials would nickname the voice "HAL" since it sounded like the similarly named computer in the film 2001: A Space Odyssey.

When Concourse E opened in 1994, the synthesized voice was replaced by a pre-recorded voice. However, due to public outcry, the synthesized voice was quickly brought back and would remain for two more years. As the 1996 Summer Olympics in Atlanta drew closer, the airport sought to again replace the synthesized voice with a pre-recorded voice fearing that the influx of international travelers would have a hard time understanding the synthesized voice. By the time the Olympics started, the airport again replaced the synthesized voice with a pre-recorded male voice provided by local voice talent Bill Murray (not to be confused with actor and comedian Bill Murray). The 1996 recordings also used chimes to precede the messages.

A different pre-recorded male voice debuted inside the trains in 2002, a year after the new vehicles debuted on the system. The 2002 recordings did not have chimes, though the doors closing message and its associated chime from the 1996 recordings would continue to be used on the platforms until the mid-2010s.

In 2006, the system's first female voice debuted, which was provided by the voice of Susan Bennett. Bennett is the voice of Delta Air Lines gate boarding announcements at the airport and has since become famous for being the original voice of Siri on Apple products. The 2006 recordings were also the first to use a radiotelegraphy alphabet to clarify the identification of the Concourse stations.

From March 2012 to November 2024, the announcements were provided by voice actress Sharon Feingold. Feingold has also been the voice for the ATL SkyTrain since its opening in 2009. The current announcements are the first to no longer use the word "Concourse", instead referring to the concourse stations with the word "Gates" (e.g. "A Gates"). They also reference the name of the train, used chimes, and added announcements for the International Terminal and Concourse F (which opened that year).

The current announcements which debuted in November 2024, are provided by Ryan Cameron, an Emmy-winning Atlanta native radio host.

By the mid-2010s, Bill Murray's voice was still in use in the stations (including the Concourse F station when it first opened) to alert passengers when the doors close, stating:

"Careful ! Doors are closing and will not re-open. Please wait for the next train."

Murray's voice was retired between 2013-2015 and message was updated with a different recorded male voice and the same chime as the current in-vehicle chime.

== Future ==
New Innovia APM 300R vehicles

In 2024, the airport ordered 29 new Innovia APM 300R railcars to replace some of the existing railcars.

== See also ==
- List of airport people mover systems
