= ATL SkyTrain =

Landside people mover at Hartsfield-Jackson Atlanta International Airport

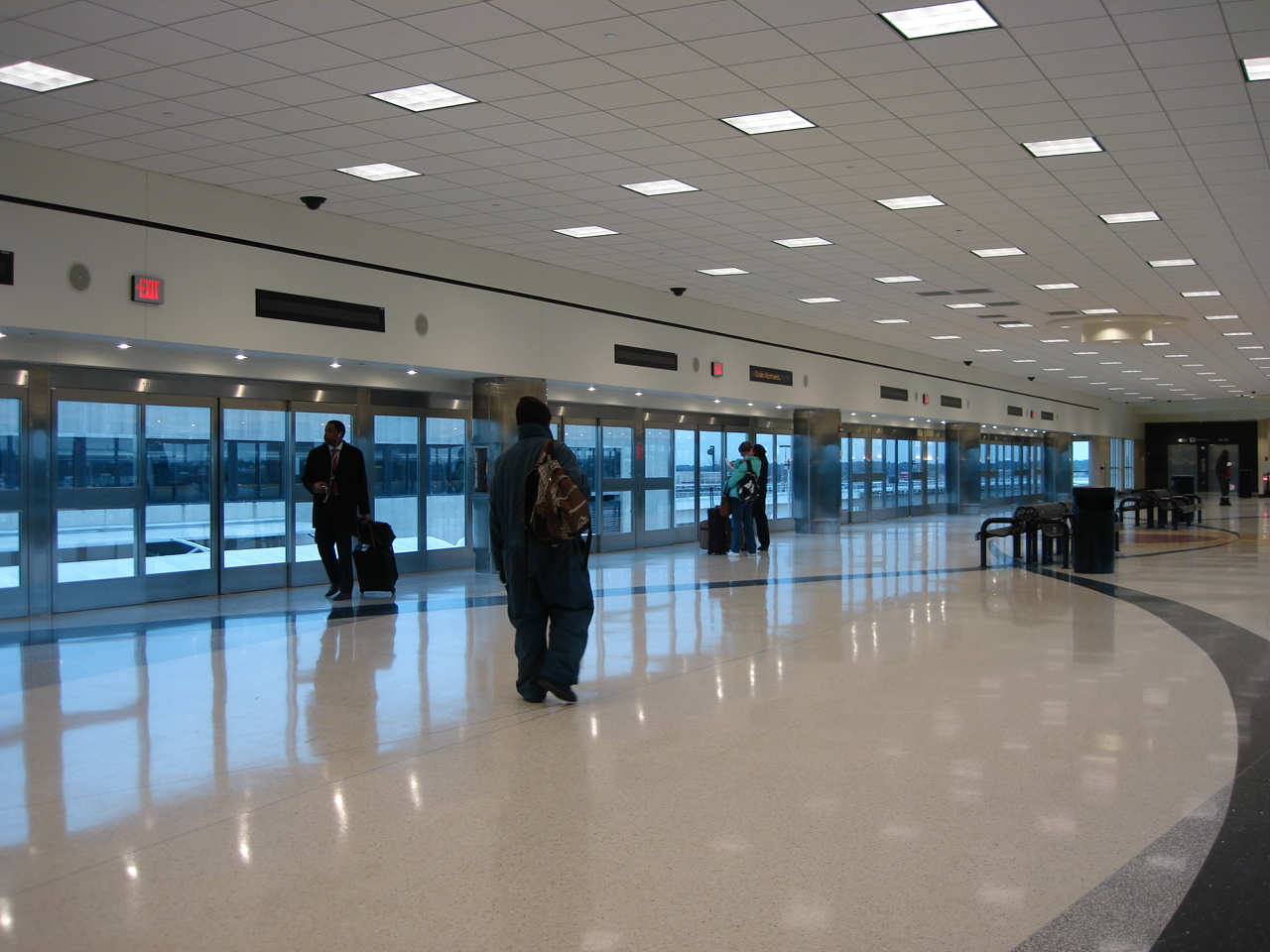

Overview
- Owner: Atlanta Department of Aviation
- Locale: Hartsfield–Jackson Atlanta International Airport
- Termini: Domestic Terminal; Rental Car Center
- Stations: 3

Service
- Type: People mover
- Services: 1
- Operator(s): Atlanta Department of Aviation
- Rolling stock: 6 × 2-car Mitsubishi Crystal Mover

History
- Opened: December 8, 2009

Technical
- Line length: 1.5 mi (2.4 km)
- Character: Fully elevated and grade-separated
- Track gauge: 1,850 mm (6 ft 27/32 in)
- Electrification: Third rail, 750 V DC
- Operating speed: 40 mph (64 km/h)

The ATL SkyTrain is an automated people mover (APM) at Hartsfield–Jackson Atlanta International Airport that runs 24/7 between the domestic terminal and rental car center.

== Layout and operation ==
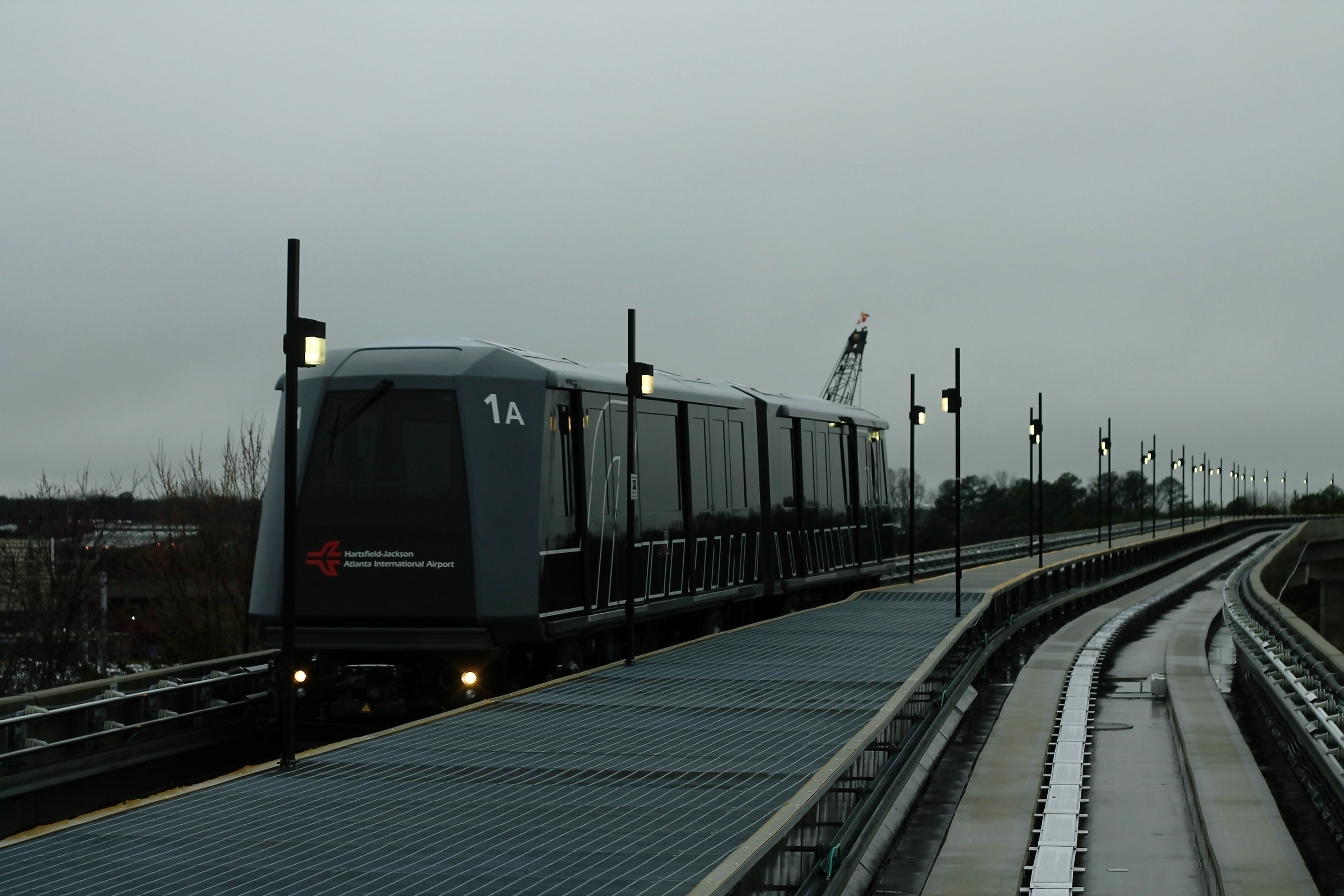
Mitsubishi Crystal Movers used on ATL SkyTrain

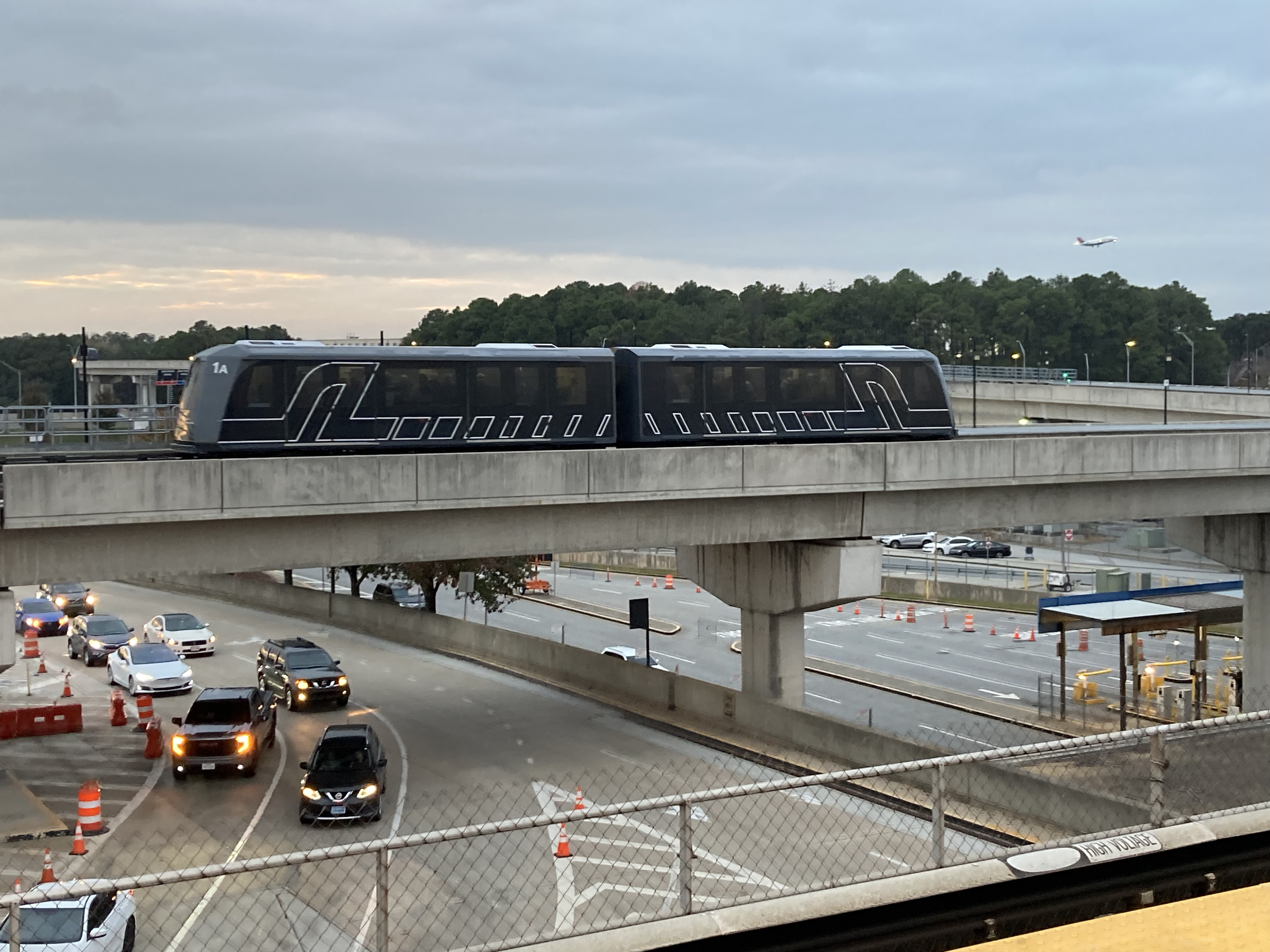
SkyTrain in 2024 Interior of ATL SkyTrain

The system opened on December 8, 2009, to connect the airport's domestic terminal with the newly opened rental car center and Gateway Center of the Georgia International Convention Center. Unlike The Plane Train, which is underground inside the secure zone of the airport, the ATL SkyTrain is located outside the airport's secure zone and is elevated, crossing I-85. The ride between the terminal and the rental car center takes 5 minutes, with trains running at 3 minute intervals during peak times. The station at the terminal is located on the west end of the Domestic Terminal, adjacent to MARTA's Airport station.

The system's announcements are voiced by professional voice talent Sharon Feingold, who is also the voice behind the Incline Railway at Lookout Mountain in Chattanooga, Tennessee, and from March 2012-December 2024, the voice behind The Plane Train.

In 2020, the airport authority opened a new remote parking garage (ATL West) adjacent to the GICC Gateway stop, connected by an elevated walkway.

=== Rolling stock ===
The system uses Mitsubishi Crystal Mover vehicles. There are 12 cars that run as six two-car trains, plus one maintenance vehicle. The vehicles are stored and maintained at a facility near the rental car center. The specifications for each car are as follows:

- Passenger capacity: 8/85 (seated/standing) per car
- Weight: 76,000 pounds (34.4 t)
- Length: 77 feet 1 inch (23.5 m)
- Width: 8 feet 10 inches (2.69 m)
- Height: 12 feet 2.7 inches (3,725 mm)
- Top speed: 40 miles per hour (64 km/h) (design: 50 miles per hour (80 km/h))

== See also ==
- List of airport people mover systems
