= Hartsfield–Jackson Atlanta International Airport =

Airport in Atlanta, Georgia, United States

Hartsfield-Jackson Atlanta International Airport
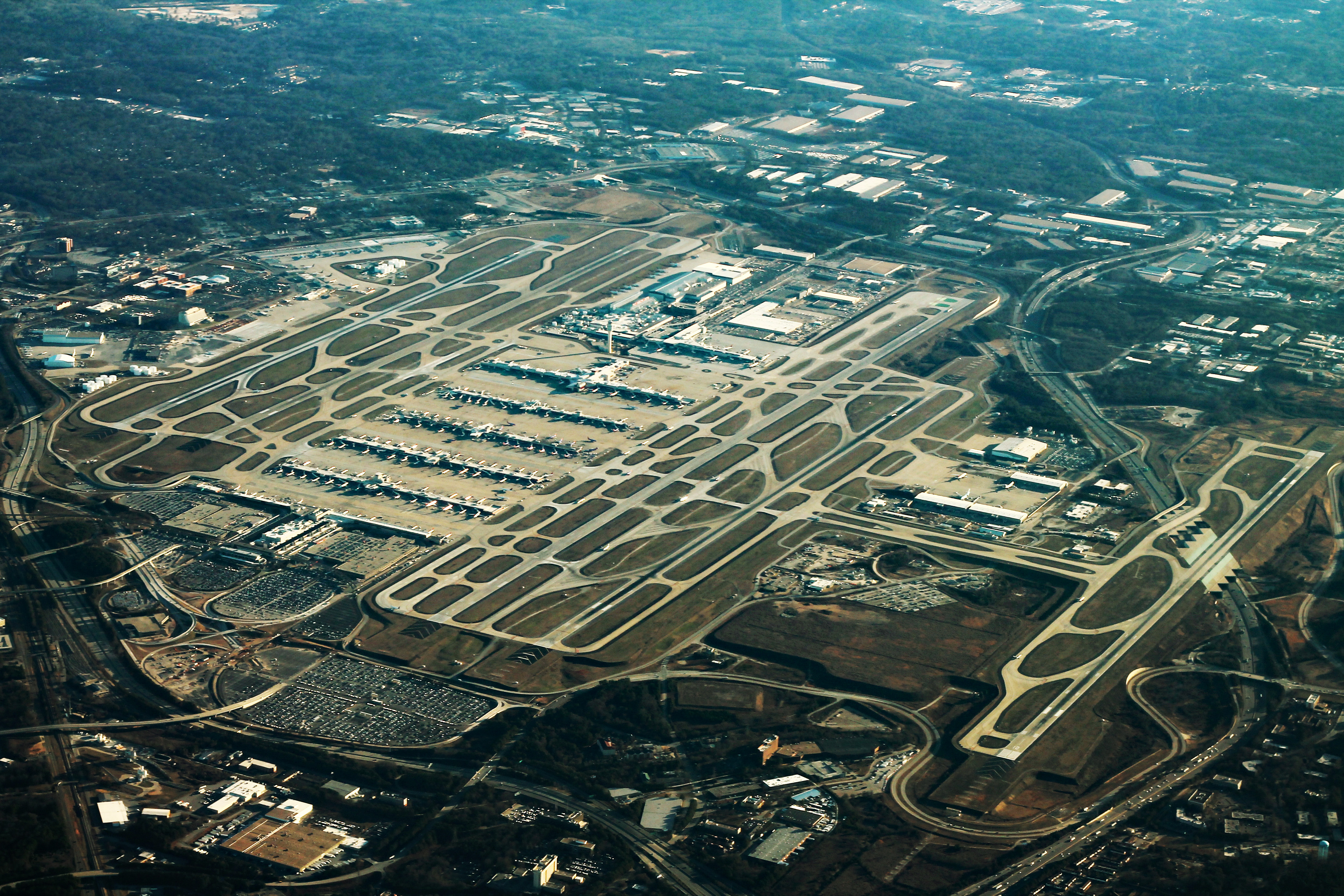
- Aerial view of ATL
- IATA: ATL; ICAO: KATL; FAA LID: ATL; WMO: 72219

Summary
- Airport type: Public
- Owner: City of Atlanta
- Operator: Atlanta Department of Aviation
- Serves: Metro Atlanta
- Location: Clayton and Fulton counties, Georgia, U.S.
- Opened: September 15, 1926; 100 years ago
- Hub for: Delta Air Lines
- Operating base for: Frontier Airlines; Southwest Airlines
- Time zone: EST (UTC−05:00)
  - Summer (DST): EDT (UTC−04:00)
- Elevation AMSL: 313 m (1,027 ft)
- Coordinates: 33°38′12″N 84°25′41″W
- Website: atl.com

Maps
- FAA airport diagram
- Interactive map of Hartsfield-Jackson Atlanta International Airport

Runways
Direction	Length		Surface
Direction	m	ft	Surface
8L/26R	2,743	9,000	Asphalt
8R/26L	3,048	9,999	Asphalt
9L/27R	3,776	12,390	Asphalt
9R/27L	2,743	9,000	Asphalt
10/28	2,743	9,000	Asphalt

Helipads
Number	Length		Surface
Number	m	ft	Surface
H1	17	52	Asphalt

Statistics (2025)
- Passengers: 106,302,208 ▼1.6%
- Rank (world): 1st
- Aircraft operations: 805,268
- Cargo (metric tons): 640,494
- Source: Hartsfield–Jackson Atlanta International Airport

Hartsfield–Jackson Atlanta International Airport (IATA: ATL, ICAO: KATL, FAA LID: ATL) is the primary international airport serving Atlanta and its surrounding metropolitan area in the U.S. state of Georgia. Located 10 mi (16 km; 8.7 nmi) south of the Downtown Atlanta district, it is named after former Atlanta mayors William B. Hartsfield and Maynard Jackson.

Since 1998, Hartsfield–Jackson has been the world's busiest airport by passenger traffic, except 2020, when its passenger traffic dipped for that year due to travel restrictions resulting from the COVID-19 pandemic. In 2025, Hartsfield–Jackson served 106.3 million passengers, the most of any airport in the world.

Hartsfield–Jackson is the primary hub of Delta Air Lines, and it is home to the airline's corporate headquarters. With just over 1,000 flights a day to 225 domestic and international destinations, the Delta hub is the world's largest airline hub, and it is considered the first mega-hub in America. Additionally, Hartsfield–Jackson is the home of Delta's Technical Operations Center, which is the airline's primary maintenance, repair, and overhaul arm. Aside from Delta, Hartsfield–Jackson is also an operating base for low-cost carriers Frontier Airlines and Southwest Airlines. The airport offers international service to North America, Latin America, Europe, Africa, the Middle East, and East Asia.

Hartsfield–Jackson is mostly in unincorporated areas of Clayton County, but it spills into Fulton County, with a portion of the airport within the city limits of Atlanta following an annexation by the city in 1960, as well as portions within College Park and Hapeville. Its domestic terminal is served by MARTA's Red and Gold rail lines. Hartsfield–Jackson covers 4,700 acres (7.3 sq mi; 19 km^{2}) of land and has five parallel runways which are aligned in an east–west direction. There are three runways that are 9,000 feet (2,743 m) long, one runway that is 10,000 feet (3,048 m) long, and the longest runway at ATL measures 12,390 feet (3,776 m) long, which can accommodate the Airbus A380.

== History ==
=== Candler Field/Atlanta Municipal Airport (1925–1961) ===
Hartsfield–Jackson began with a five-year, rent-free lease on 287 acres (116 ha) that was an abandoned auto racetrack named The Atlanta Speedway. The lease was signed on April 16, 1925, by Mayor Walter Sims, who committed the city to develop it into an airfield. As part of the agreement, the property was renamed Candler Field after its former owner, Coca-Cola tycoon and former Atlanta mayor Asa Candler. The first flight into Candler Field was September 15, 1926, a Florida Airways mail plane flying from Jacksonville, Florida. In May 1928, Pitcairn Aviation began service to Atlanta, followed in June 1930 by Delta Air Service. Those two airlines, later known as Eastern Air Lines and Delta Air Lines, respectively, would both use Atlanta as their chief hubs. The airport's weather station became the official location for Atlanta's weather observations on September 1, 1928, and records by the National Weather Service.

Atlanta was a busy airport from its inception, and by the end of 1930, it was third behind New York City and Chicago for regular daily flights with sixteen arriving and departing. Candler Field's first control tower opened March 1939. The March 1939 Official Aviation Guide shows 14 weekday airline departures: 10 Eastern and four Delta. (Note: This predecessor of today's OAG was published monthly by the Official Aviation Guide Co of Chicago.)

In October 1940, the U.S. government declared it a military airfield and the United States Army Air Forces operated Atlanta Army Airfield jointly with Candler Field. The Air Force used Hartsfield–Jackson primarily to service many types of transient combat aircraft. During World War II, the airport doubled in size and set a record of 1,700 takeoffs and landings in a single day, making it the nation's busiest in terms of flight operations. Atlanta Army Airfield closed after the war.

In 1942, Candler Field was renamed Atlanta Municipal Airport and by 1948, more than one million passengers passed through a war surplus hangar that served as a terminal building. Delta and Eastern had extensive networks from ATL, though Atlanta had no nonstop flights beyond Texas, St. Louis, and Chicago until 1961. Southern Airways appeared at ATL after the war and had short-haul routes around the Southeast until 1979.

In 1957, Atlanta saw its first jet airliner: a prototype Sud Aviation Caravelle that was touring the country arrived from Washington, D.C. The first scheduled turbine airliners were Capital Viscounts in June 1956; the first scheduled jets were Delta DC-8s in September 1959. The first trans-Atlantic flight was a Delta/Pan Am interchange DC-8 to Europe via Washington starting in 1964; the first scheduled international nonstops were Eastern flights to Mexico City and Jamaica in 1971–72. Nonstops to Europe started in 1978 and to Asia in 1992–93.

Atlanta claimed to be the country's busiest airport, with more than two million passengers passing through in 1957, and, between noon and 2 p.m. each day, it became the world's busiest airport. (The April 1957 OAG shows 165 weekday departures from Atlanta, including 45 between 12:05 and 2:00 PM and 20 between 2:25 and 4:25 AM.) Chicago Midway had 414-weekday departures, including 48 between 12:00 and 2:00 PM. In 1957, Atlanta was the country's ninth-busiest airport by flight count and about the same by passenger count.

=== Original jet terminal (1961–1980) ===
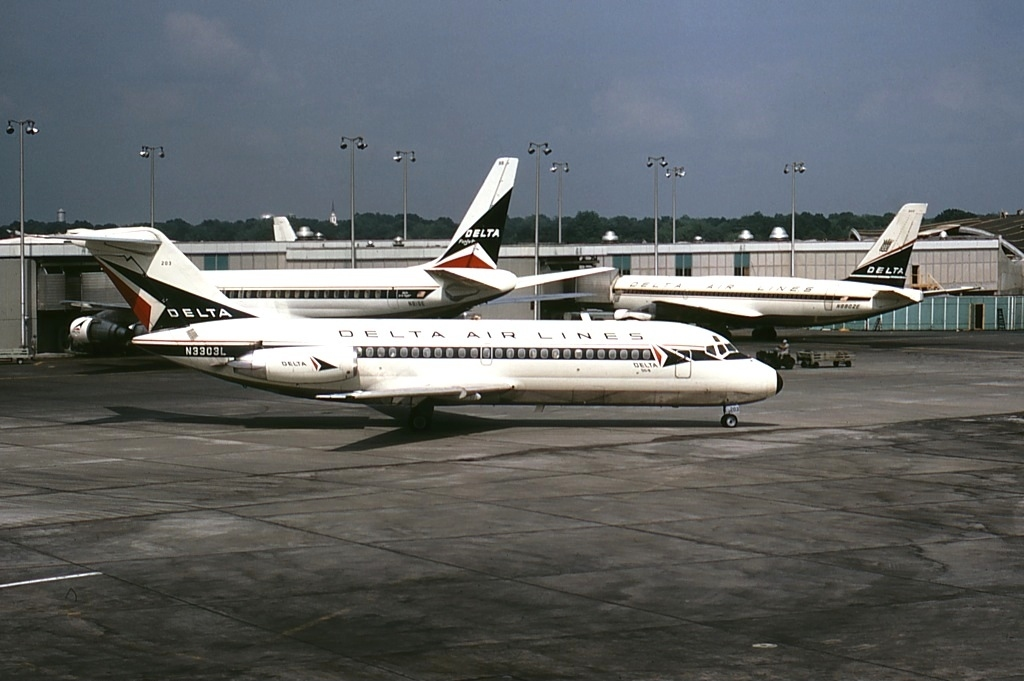
Various Delta jets on the apron of the 1961 airport

In late 1957, work began on a new $21 million terminal, which opened on May 3, 1961. In 1960, the City of Atlanta annexed the area surrounding the new terminal. Consisting of six pier-style concourses radiating from a central building, the terminal was then the largest in the country and could handle over six million travelers a year; the first year, 9.5 million people passed through. In March 1962, the longest runway (9/27, now 8R) was 7,860 feet (2,400 m); runway 3 was 5,505 feet (1,678 m) and runway 15 was 7,220 feet (2,200 m) long.

In 1971, the airport was named William B. Hartsfield Atlanta Airport in honor of Atlanta mayor William B. Hartsfield after his death. The name change took effect on February 28, 1971, which would have been Hartsfield's 81st birthday. The new name would be relatively brief, as it would be changed later in 1971 to William B. Hartsfield Atlanta International Airport with the growth of flights to and from Atlanta outside North America.

=== Midfield terminal (1980–present) ===
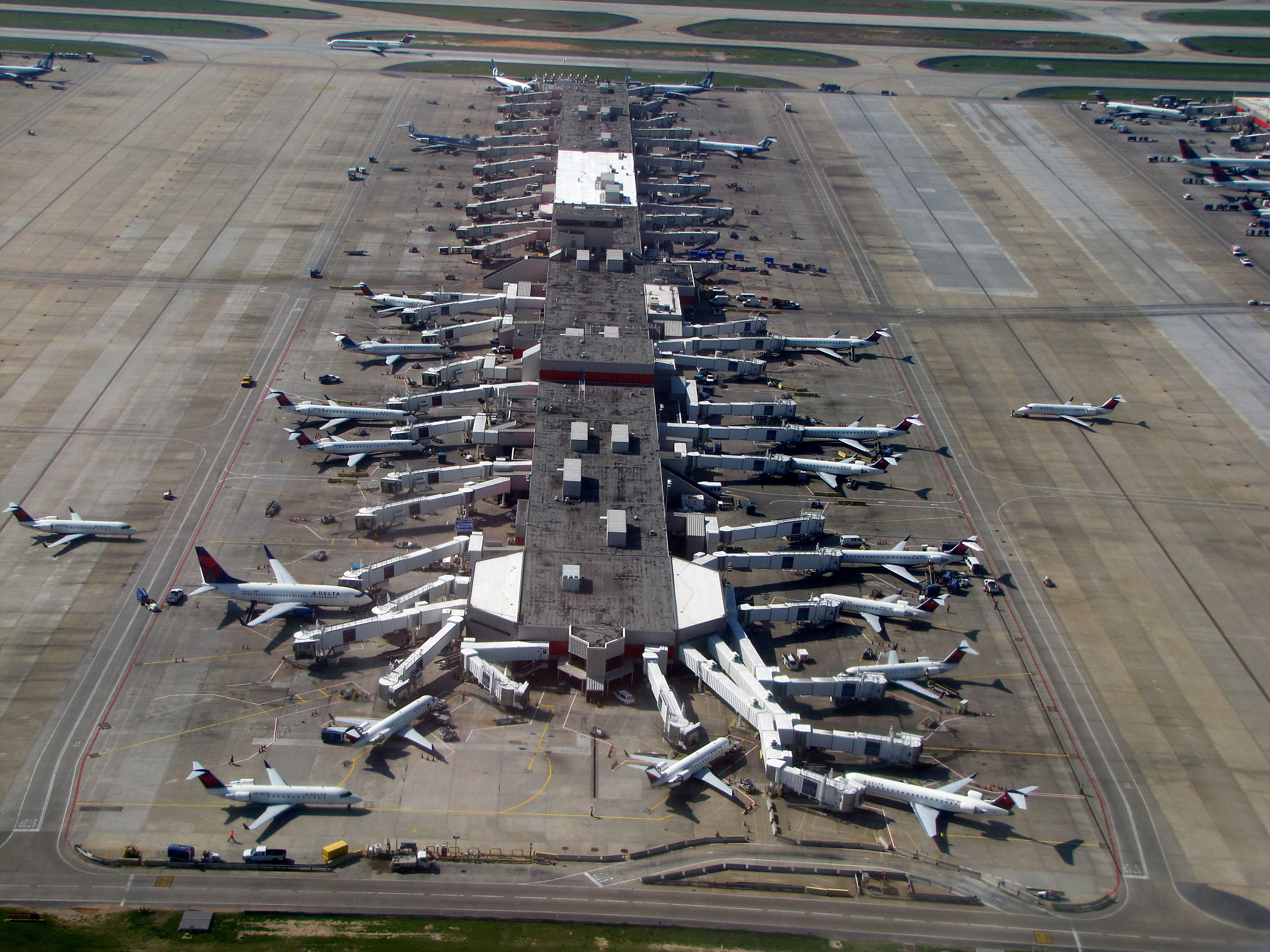
Aerial view of Concourse C

To address the significant increase in air traffic that outstripped the capacity of the 1961 terminal, and after years of planning and design, construction began on the present midfield terminal complex in 1977 under the administration of Mayor Maynard Jackson. It was billed as the largest construction project in the South, costing $500 million. The complex was designed by Stevens & Wilkinson, Smith Hinchman & Grylls, and Minority Airport Architects & Planners. The new complex — initially consisting of the North and South Terminals, Concourses A through D, and the northern half of the present-day Concourse T (which served as the International Terminal) — opened on September 21, 1980, on time and under budget. It was designed to accommodate up to 55 million passengers per year and covered 2,500,000 square feet (230,000 m^{2}). In December 1984, a 9,000-foot (2,700 m) fourth parallel runway was completed, and another runway was extended to 11,889 feet (3,624 m) the following year. To accommodate increases in international air traffic, a southern extension of Concourse T opened in 1987, and Concourse E opened in 1994 in advance of Atlanta hosting the 1996 Summer Olympics, with Concourse T subsequently being converted for use by domestic flights. MARTA rail service was extended to Hartsfield with the opening of the Airport station in 1988 (the station itself had been constructed in 1979-80 as part of the terminal).

In 1999, Hartsfield–Jackson's leadership established the development program "Focus On the Future", involving multiple construction projects to prepare the airport to handle a projected demand of 121 million passengers in 2015. The program was originally budgeted at $5.4 billion over ten years, but the total was revised by 2007 to over $9 billion.

In 2001, construction of an over 9,000-foot (2,700 m) fifth runway (10–28) began. It was completed for $1.28 billion and opened in 2006. It bridges Interstate 285 (the Perimeter) on Hartsfield–Jackson's south side, making Hartsfield–Jackson the nation's only currently active civil airport to have a runway above an interstate (although Runway 17R/35L at Stapleton International Airport in Denver, Colorado, crossed Interstate 70 until that airport closed in 1995). The massive project, which involved putting fill dirt eleven stories high in some places, destroyed some surrounding neighborhoods and dramatically changed the scenery of Flat Rock Cemetery and Hart Cemetery, both on the airport's property. It was added to help ease traffic problems caused by landing small- and mid-size aircraft on the runways used by larger planes such as the Boeing 777, which need longer runways than the smaller planes. With the fifth runway, Hartsfield–Jackson is one of only a few airports that can perform triple simultaneous landings. The fifth runway was expected to increase the capacity for landings and take-offs by 40%, from an average of 184 flights per hour to 237 flights per hour.

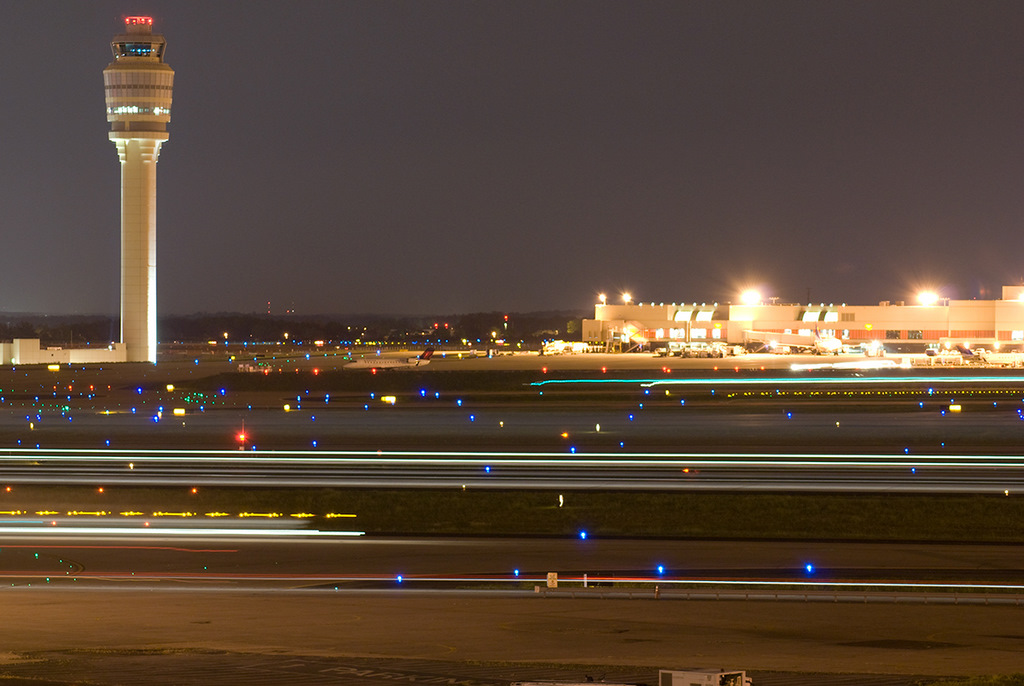
A view of the International Concourse E and control tower at night

Along with the fifth runway, a new control tower was built to see the entire runway length. The new control tower is the tallest in the United States, over 398 feet (121 m) tall. The old control tower, at 231 feet (70 m), was demolished in 2006.

In 2003, the Atlanta City Council voted to rename Hartsfield–Jackson Atlanta International Airport to honor former mayor Maynard Jackson, who died four months prior. The council planned to drop Hartsfield's name from the airport, but public outcry (occurring coincidentally during a debate over the state's flag) prevented this.

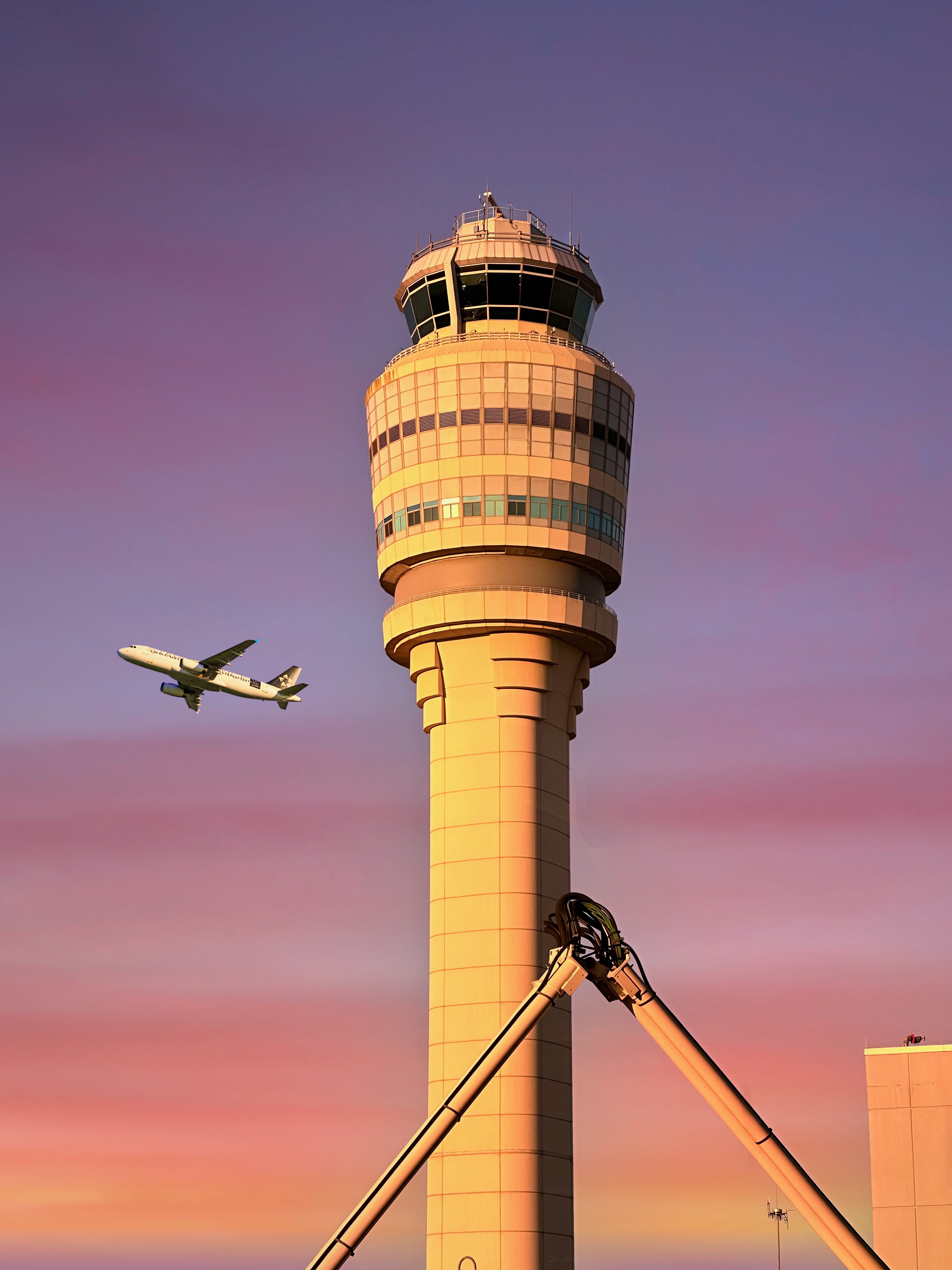
The FAA control tower is the tallest in the United States

In 2007, an "end-around taxiway" opened, Taxiway Victor. It was expected to save an estimated $26 million to $30 million in fuel each year by allowing airplanes landing on the northernmost runway (8L/26R) to taxi to the gate area without preventing other aircraft from taking off. The taxiway drops about 30 feet (9.1 m) from runway elevation to allow takeoffs to continue.

After the Southeastern U.S. drought of 2007, Hartsfield–Jackson (the state's eighth-largest water user) changed to reduce water usage. This included adjusting toilets (725 commodes and 338 urinals) and 601 sinks. (The two terminals alone use 917,000 US gal (3,470,000 L; 764,000 imp gal) a day.) It also stopped using firetrucks to spray water over aircraft when the pilot made the last landing before retirement (a water salute). The city of Macon offered to sell water to Hartsfield–Jackson through a proposed pipeline.

The Maynard H. Jackson International Terminal and Concourse F opened on the east side of the airport for international passengers in 2012. The 1980 terminal on the other end of the complex then became known as the Domestic Terminal. Before the opening of the International Terminal, all Atlanta-bound international passengers needed to go through TSA screening and transit to the terminal to exit the airport. The opening of the International Terminal eliminated the need for this practice, which had been in use since the opening of Concourse E in 1994.

Today, Hartsfield–Jackson employs about 55,300 people through airlines, ground transportation, concessions, security, the federal government, the City of Atlanta, and airport tenants; it is the largest employment center in Georgia. With a payroll of $2.4 billion, the airport has a direct and indirect economic impact of $3.2 billion on the local and regional economy and an annual regional economic impact of more than $19.8 billion.

In 2015, Hartsfield–Jackson became the first airport in the world to serve 100 million passengers in a year. Hartsfield–Jackson is routinely cited as one of the world's busiest, topping the Airports Council International rankings in 2022 and 2023.

=== Historic airline service ===
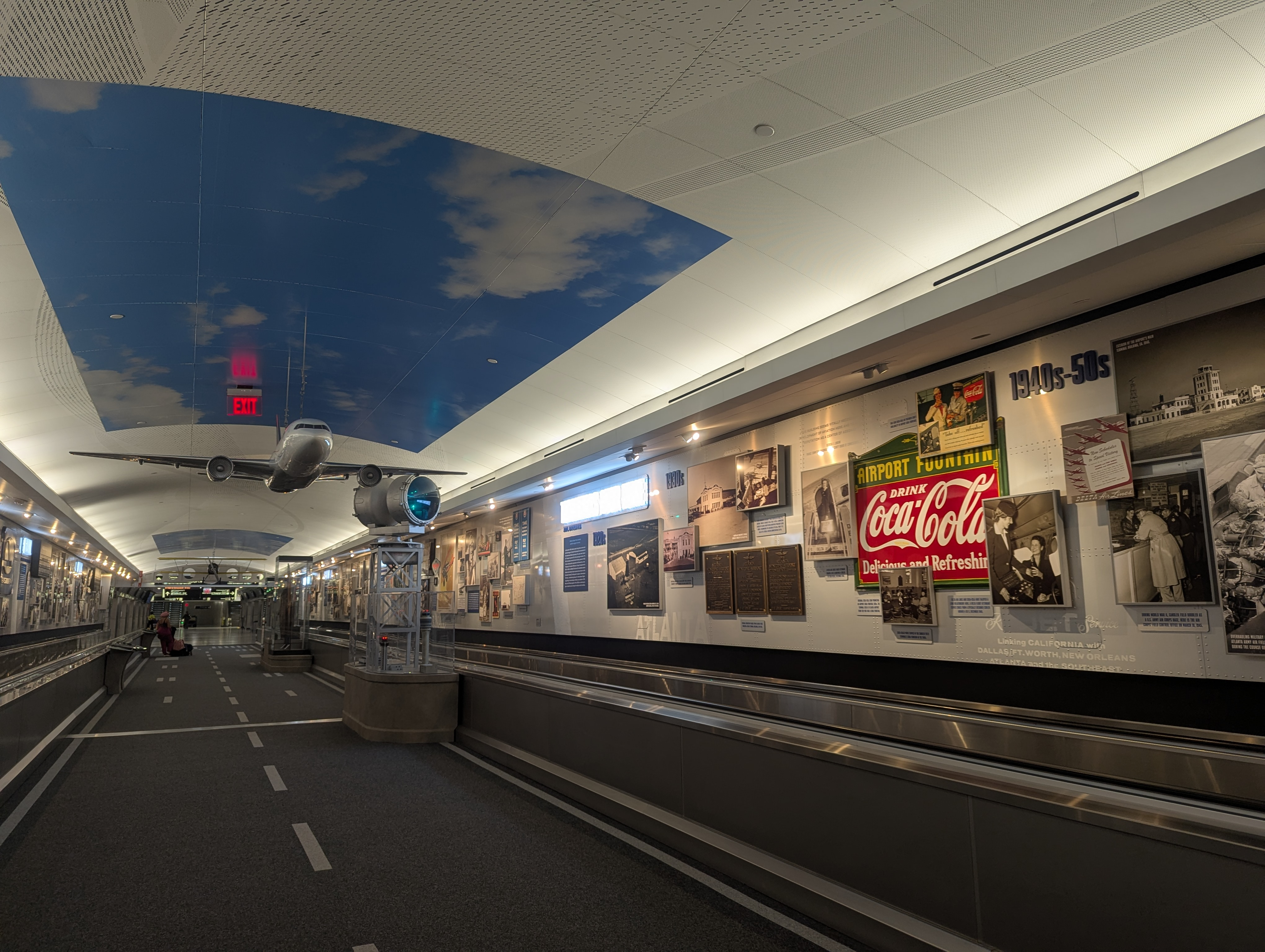
An exhibit on the airport's history was opened between Concourses D and E in 2026 to coincide with the airport's centennial

Delta and Eastern dominated Hartsfield–Jackson during the 1970s. United, Southern, Piedmont, Northwest and TWA were also present. In 1978, after airline deregulation,United Airlines stopped serving Atlanta until 1984, while Southern successor Republic was the airport's third-largest carrier.

Eastern was a larger airline than Delta until deregulation in 1978, but Delta was early to adopt the hub-and-spoke route system, with Atlanta as a hub between the Midwest and Florida, giving it an advantage in the Atlanta market. When the current terminal complex opened in 1980, Delta occupied all of Concourse A and the southern side of Concourse B, while Eastern occupied the remainder of Concourse B and all of Concourse C. All other domestic airlines used Concourse D, and Concourse T (known then as the International Concourse) was used by international flights.

Eastern ceased operations in 1991. From Eastern's demise to the 1996 Summer Olympics, Delta's hub grew to occupy all of Concourse B and the southern side of Concourse T (which opened in 1987), and international flights moved to the new Concourse E (which opened in 1994). By 1996, Delta's regional affiliate Atlantic Southeast Airlines (operating as Delta Connection) relocated to the north side of Concourse C and the gates were converted for use by regional aircraft.

After Eastern ceased operation, Northwest Airlines (the successor of Republic) briefly expressed interest in establishing an Atlanta hub but ultimately decided against it. American Airlines also considered establishing an Atlanta hub around that time but decided Delta was too strong there and instead replaced Eastern's other hub in Miami. In 1992, TWA created a small hub at Atlanta and relocated to some of Eastern's former gates on Concourse C. TWA abandoned the Atlanta hub concept in 1994 leaving Delta with a monopoly hub at Atlanta.

Japan Airlines was the first Asian carrier to serve Atlanta in 1986. In December 1994, Korean Air became the second Asian carrier to serve Hartsfield–Jackson.

Atlanta-based ValuJet was established in 1993 as a low-cost competition for Delta at ATL. ValuJet built up its hub on Concourse C in the following years. However, ValuJet's safety practices were questioned early, and the airline was grounded after the 1996 crash of ValuJet Flight 592. ValuJet resumed operations later that year, and in 1997, it merged with AirTran Airways. AirTran would continue operating the hub and was the second-largest airline at ATL through the 2000s. AirTran was acquired by Southwest Airlines in 2011, which did not serve Atlanta before the acquisition. AirTran was fully absorbed into Southwest in 2014, continuing to operate Atlanta as a focus city and remaining Hartsfield–Jackson's second-largest carrier. In 2024, Southwest announced it was permanently cutting 15 destinations from Atlanta, reducing its footprint from 18 gates to 11, and cutting staff.

In recent years, Hartsfield–Jackson has had an increase in non-Delta flights, both due to the rapid population growth of Metro Atlanta and the airport's prominence as a major hub. Since 2015, Hartsfield–Jackson has seen growth from low-cost carriers such as Frontier Airlines and Spirit Airlines. Spirit also established Atlanta as an operating base.

In addition to the growth of the low-cost carriers, international carriers have increasingly offered service to Atlanta since 2014. In 2014, Virgin Atlantic began offering direct flights to London and in 2015, the airline began offering direct flights to Manchester. In May 2016, Turkish Airlines began offering direct flights to Istanbul and Qatar Airways began Doha flights just one month later on June 1. In March 2019, WestJet began offering direct flights to Calgary, and in 2023, the airline started non-stop service to Vancouver and Winnipeg. In 2024, WestJet began non-stop service to Edmonton. Copa Airlines became the first Latin American carrier to serve Hartsfield–Jackson in December 2021 with direct flights to Panama City. In June 2022, Air Canada reintroduced Montreal service. Ethiopian Airlines started service to Atlanta in 2023, becoming the first African carrier to serve the airport since South African Airways ended service in 2006. LATAM Perú started service to Atlanta in October 2023 from Lima. Aeromexico Connect resumed service to Atlanta in January 2024 with nonstop service to Guadalajara. Nonstop service to Leon/Guanajuato and Mérida began in March 2024. Nonstop service to Querétaro started service in August 2024. Scandinavian Airlines started service to Atlanta in June 2024 with direct flights from Copenhagen. Etihad Airways started nonstop service to Atlanta on July 2, 2025, with direct flights to Abu Dhabi.

== Facilities ==
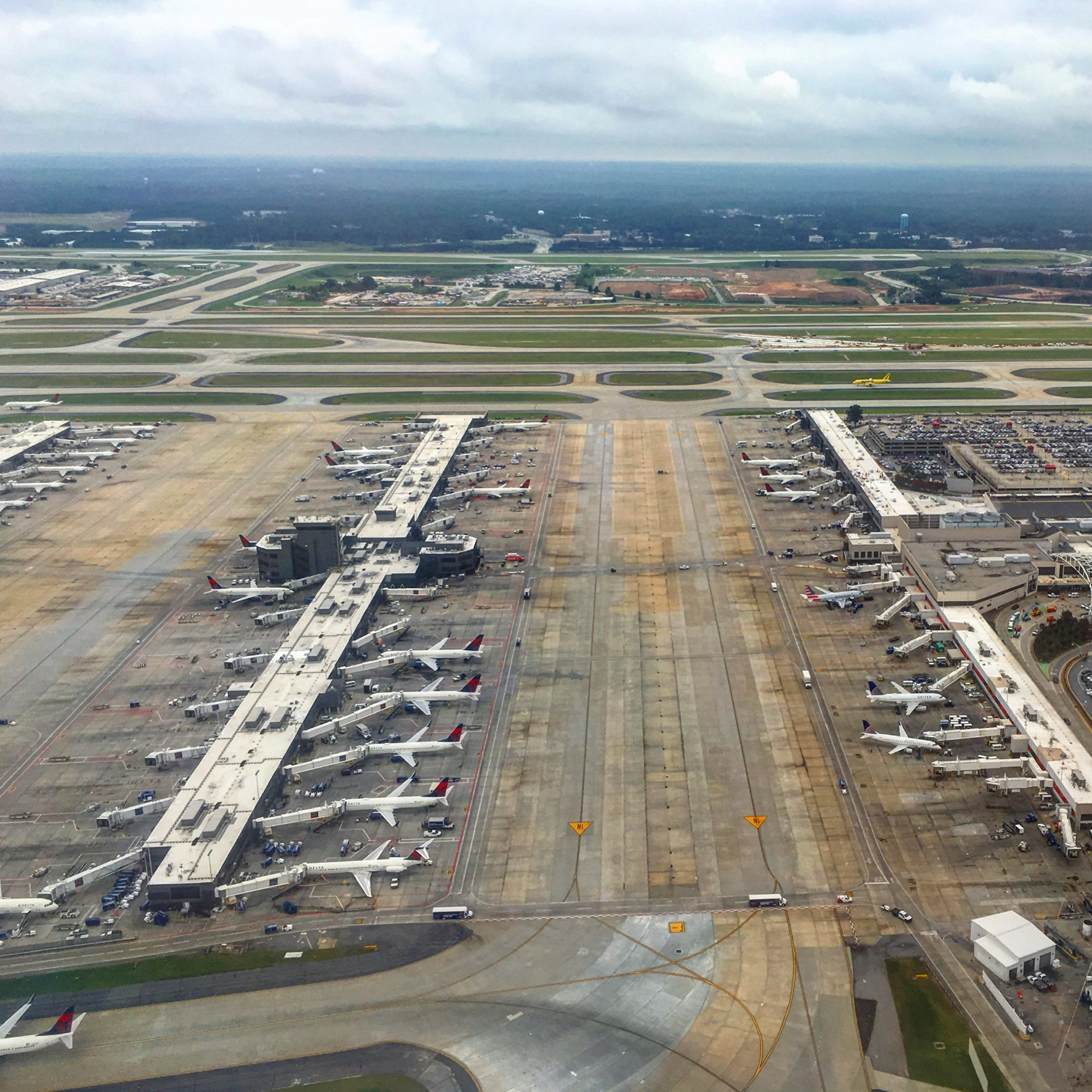
View of concourses A and T from a departing Delta flight in August 2018

=== Terminals ===
Hartsfield–Jackson Atlanta International Airport has two terminals and seven concourses with a total of 237 gates. The Domestic Terminal is located on the west side of Hartsfield–Jackson and the Maynard H. Jackson Jr. International Terminal is on the east side of the airport. The Domestic Terminal has entrances on both sides, which are known as Domestic Terminal North and Domestic Terminal South. Concourse T is directly connected to the Domestic Terminal and Concourse F is directly connected to the International Terminal. The remaining five concourses (Concourses A-E) are located between the two terminals and are parallel to one another. The terminals and concourses are connected airside by the Transportation Mall, an underground pedestrian tunnel with a series of moving walkways and The Plane Train, a 24/7 underground automated people mover. A second underground walkway connecting the north sides of Concourses B and C once existed for Eastern Air Lines. This underground walkway was closed in the late 2000s and is now used for Hartsfield–Jackson's baggage system.

Delta Air Lines' hub includes operations at all seven concourses. The south side of Concourse T and all of Concourses A and B are used exclusively by Delta for mainline domestic flights. Delta's regional flights (operated as Delta Connection) primarily operate from the north side of Concourse C. The south side of Concourse C is used by Southwest Airlines for their operating base and it is used for some Alaska and Frontier flights. Frontier Airlines uses gates on the north end of Concourse E for their operating base. Spirit Airlines operated in Concourse E and some gates on the south side of Concourse D. All other airlines uses Concourse T. Some Delta and Delta Connection flights operate on Concourse D as well.

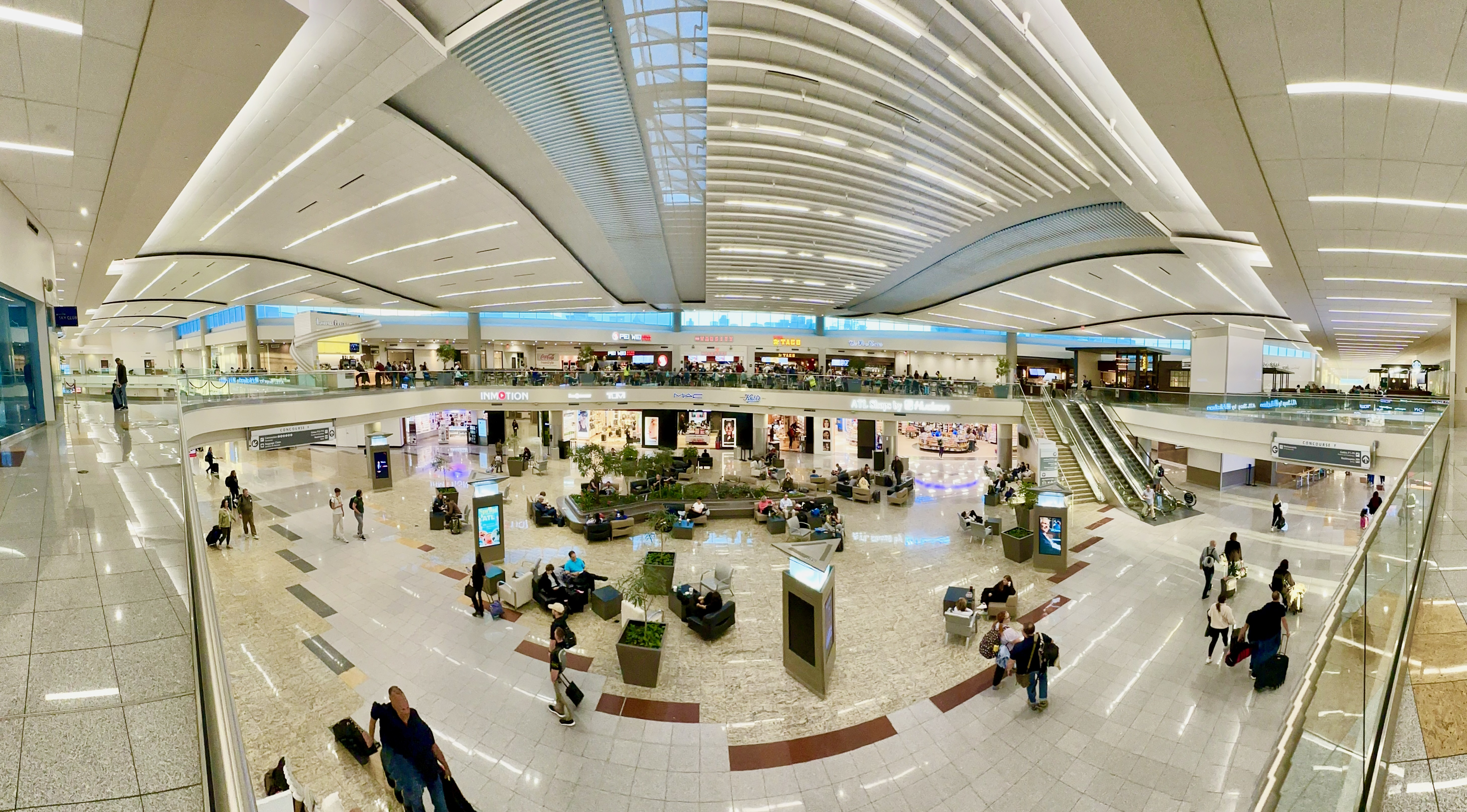
The Maynard H. Jackson Jr. International Terminal in May 2023

International flights operate in Concourses E and F. Concourse F is the only concourse in Hartsfield–Jackson that has a gate that can accommodate an Airbus A380, the largest passenger aircraft in the world. All non-Delta international carriers operate their ATL flights from this terminal, including Delta's partners such as Air France, KLM, Korean Air, LATAM, Virgin Atlantic, Scandinavian, and WestJet. Aeromexico operates in Concourse E. Some WestJet flights operate in Concourse D.

International passengers arriving in Concourse F will be processed at the Customs and Border Protection checkpoint in that concourse before exiting into the landside of the international terminal. In Concourse E, international passengers ending their journeys in Atlanta will go through a dedicated underground walkway to the Concourse F checkpoint. International passengers arriving in Concourse E that are connecting to another flight will be processed in a separate checkpoint on Concourse E and reenter the concourse via a dedicated TSA checkpoint.

- Concourse T contains 21 gates.
- Concourse A contains 34 gates.
- Concourse B contains 36 gates.
- Concourse C contains 55 gates.
- Concourse D contains 35 gates.
- Concourse E contains 42 gates.
- Concourse F contains 14 gates.

Concourse D expansion at ATL

Concourse D is currently undergoing an expansion estimated to cost around $1.4 Billion USD to widen the concourse from 60 feet to 99 feet wide and extend the length of the concourse to 288 feet. The project does this by building modules that make parts of the building and then moves them towards the airfield at night across 2 runways to minimize disruptions of operations at Hartsfield. It is estimated to complete in 2029. It would have a net loss of 6 gates reducing its gate capacity from 40 to 34 to allow for modern narrow-body aircraft such as the Boeing 737 MAX Variants and A320Neo family to fit in comfortably replacing the structures originally made for small aircraft when it first was completed.

=== Ground transportation ===
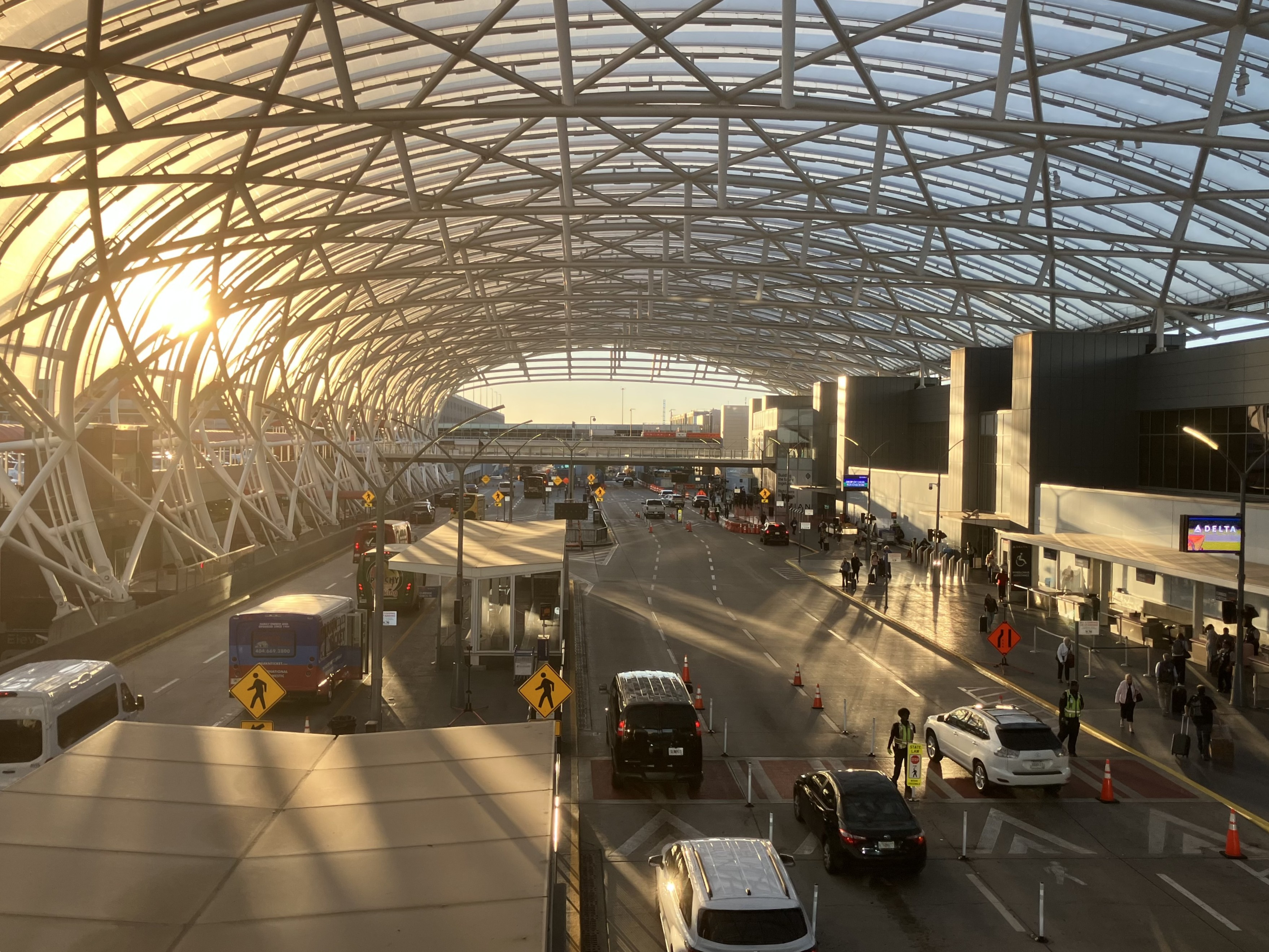
The upper level of the Domestic Terminal South pickup and drop-off area. All ticket counters and baggage facilities on this side of the airport's domestic terminal are operated by Delta Air Lines.

The domestic terminal can be accessed directly from Interstate 85 southbound at exit 72 (Camp Creek Pkwy), or from Interstate 85 northbound at exit 71 (Riverdale Rd). The international terminal is accessed directly from Interstate 75 at exit 239. These freeways in turn connect with the following additional freeways within 10 miles: Interstate 285, Interstate 675, Langford Parkway, and Interstate 20.

The airport offers paid parking in several parking garages and lots around the airport, with a total of 33,000 parking spots as of June 2024. Some parking decks are directly connected to the airport, while others are reachable by shuttle or the ATL SkyTrain. Several privately owned parking facilities are located off-site near the airport with shuttle access.

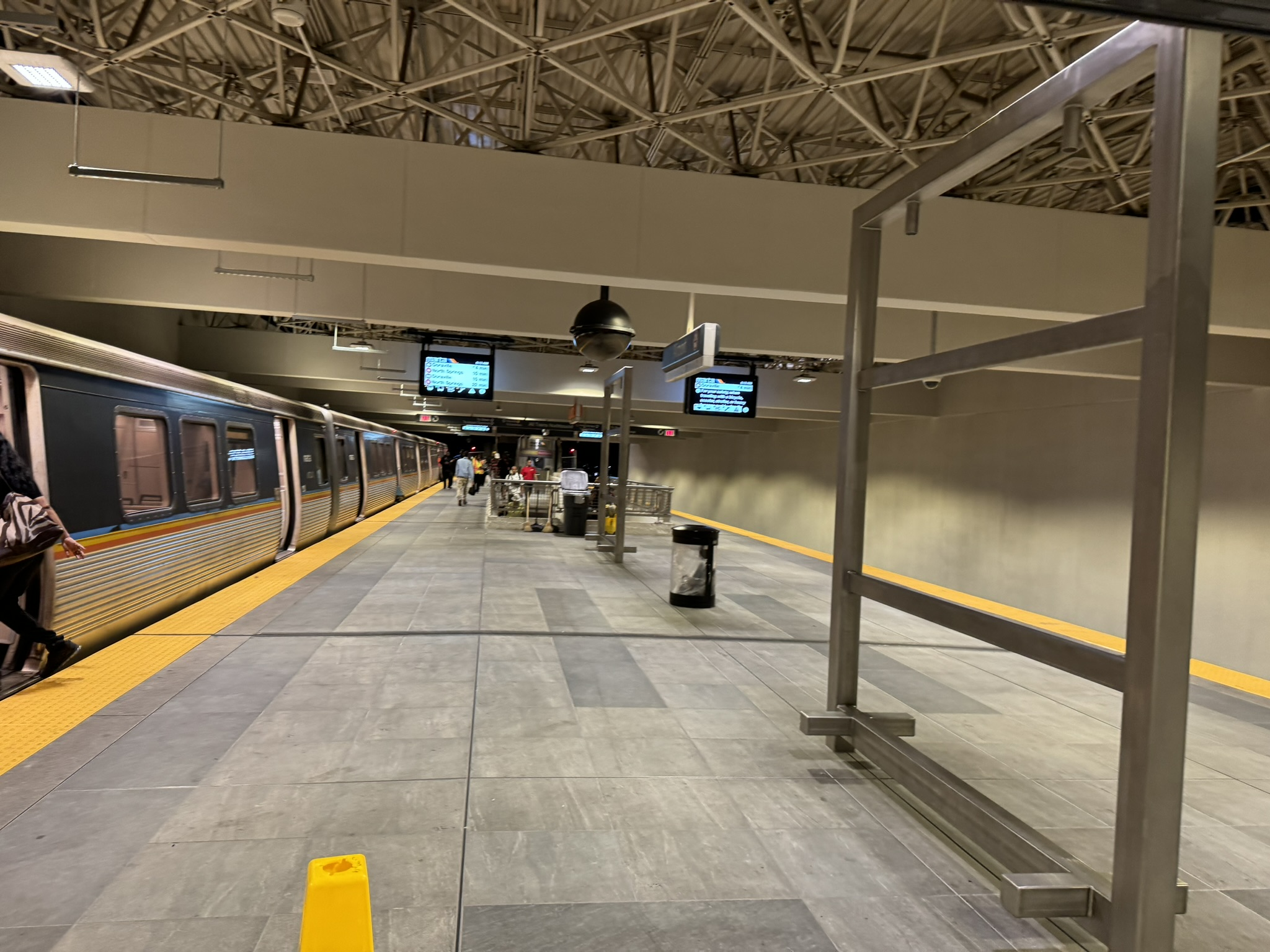
A northbound MARTA rail train at Airport station

Hartsfield–Jackson's domestic terminal has its own train station on the city's rapid transit system, MARTA, served by the Red and Gold lines. The above-ground station is inside the main building, between the north and south domestic terminals on the west end. The Airport station is currently the southernmost station in the MARTA system, though expansions via metro or commuter rail further south into Clayton County have been discussed.

The airport is also served by the MARTA bus system, with Route 191 serving the airport's international terminal from Lakewood/Fort McPherson station on the MARTA rail network and bus stations to the south in Clayton County including a stop serving the airport's cargo ramp and the Harold R. Banke Justice Center bus terminal in Jonesboro.

The Hartsfield–Jackson Rental Car Center, which opened December 8, 2009, houses all 10 airport rental agencies with capacity for additional companies. The complex features 9,900 parking spaces split between two four-story parking decks that together cover 2.8 million square feet (260,000 m^{2}), a 137,000-square-foot (12,700 m^{2}) customer service center, and a maintenance center featuring 140 gas pumps and 30 wash bays equipped with a water recovery system. An automated people mover, the ATL SkyTrain, runs between the rental car center, the Domestic Terminal, and the Gateway Center of the Georgia International Convention Center, while a four-lane roadway that spans Interstate 85 connects the rental car center with the existing airport road network.

=== Other facilities ===
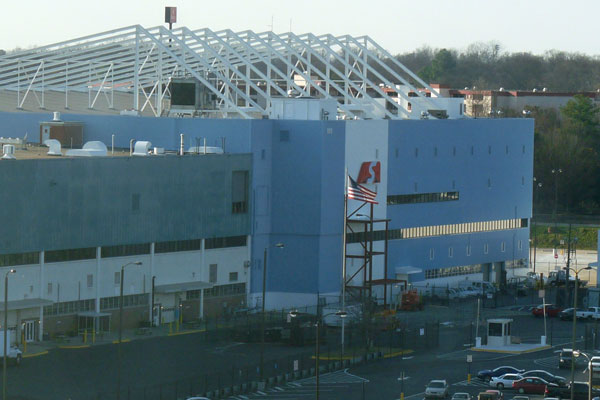
990 Toffie Terrace hangar, former ExpressJet/Atlantic Southeast Airlines headquarters

The 990 Toffie Terrace hangar, a part of Hartsfield–Jackson Airport and located within the City of College Park corporate limits, is owned by the City of Atlanta. The building now houses the Atlanta Police Department Helicopter Unit. It once served as the headquarters of the regional airline ExpressJet.

Before its merger with ExpressJet, Atlantic Southeast Airlines was headquartered in the hangar, then named the A-Tech Center. In December 2007, the airline announced it was moving its headquarters into the facility, previously named the "North Hangar". The 203,000-square-foot (18,900 m^{2}) hangar includes 100,000 square feet (9,300 m^{2}) of hangar bays for aircraft maintenance. It has 17 acres (6.9 ha) of adjacent land and 1,400 parking spaces for employees. The airline planned to relocate 100 employees from Macon to the new headquarters. The Atlanta City Council and Mayor of Atlanta Shirley Franklin approved the new 25-year ASA lease, which also gave the airline new hangar space to work on 15 to 25 aircraft in overnight maintenance; previously, its aircraft were serviced at Concourse C. Hartsfield–Jackson property division stated that the hangar was built in the 1960s and renovated in the 1970s. Eastern Air Lines and Delta Air Lines had previously occupied the hangar. Delta's lease originally was scheduled to expire in 2010, but the airline returned the lease to the City of Atlanta in 2005 as part of its bankruptcy settlement. The city collected an insurance settlement of almost $900,000 due to the cancellation.

=== Law enforcement ===
Law enforcement at Hartsfield–Jackson Atlanta International Airport (ATL) is handled primarily by the Airport Section of the Atlanta Police Department (APD), which covers terminals, concourses, and parking. They operate alongside federal partners, including the Transportation Security Administration (TSA) and U.S. Customs and Border Protection (CBP).

== Airlines and destinations ==
=== Passenger ===
Airlines	Destinations
Aeroméxico Connect	León/El Bajío, Monterrey, Querétaro
Air Canada	Toronto–Pearson; Seasonal: Montréal–Trudeau
Air Canada Express	Montréal–Trudeau, Toronto–Pearson
Air France	Paris–Charles de Gaulle
Alaska Airlines	Portland (OR), Seattle/Tacoma
American Airlines	Charlotte, Chicago–O'Hare, Dallas/Fort Worth, Los Angeles, Miami, Philadelphia, Phoenix–Sky Harbor; Seasonal: Washington–National
American Eagle	Charlotte, Chicago–O'Hare, Miami, New York–LaGuardia, Philadelphia, Washington–National; Seasonal: Dallas/Fort Worth
Avelo Airlines	Dallas/McKinney (begins December 16, 2026), Lakeland, New Haven
British Airways	London–Heathrow
Contour Airlines	DuBois (PA) (begins February 1, 2027)
Copa Airlines	Panama City–Tocumen
Delta Air Lines	Albany (NY), Albuquerque, Amsterdam, Anchorage, Antigua, Appleton, Aruba, Asheville, Augusta (GA), Austin, Baltimore, Barbados, Barcelona, Baton Rouge, Belize City, Bermuda, Birmingham (AL), Bogotá, Boise, Bonaire, Boston, Bozeman, Brussels, Buenos Aires–Ezeiza, Buffalo, Burbank, Burlington (VT), Cancún, Cape Town, Cartagena, Cedar Rapids/Iowa City, Charleston (SC), Charlotte, Chattanooga, Chicago–Midway, Chicago–O'Hare, Cincinnati, Cleveland, Colorado Springs, Columbia (SC), Columbus–Glenn, Curaçao, Dallas/Fort Worth, Dallas–Love, Dayton, Daytona Beach, Denver, Des Moines, Destin/Fort Walton Beach, Detroit, Dublin, El Paso, Fayetteville/Bentonville, Fort Lauderdale, Fort Myers, Frankfurt, Gainesville, Grand Cayman, Grand Rapids, Green Bay, Greensboro, Greenville/Spartanburg, Grenada, Guadalajara, Guatemala City, Gulfport/Biloxi, Harrisburg, Hartford, Honolulu, Houston–Hobby, Houston–Intercontinental, Huntsville, Indianapolis, Jackson (MS), Jacksonville (FL), Johannesburg–O. R. Tambo, Kansas City, Key West, Kingston–Norman Manley, Knoxville, Lagos, Las Vegas, Lexington, Liberia (CR), Lima, Little Rock, London–Heathrow, Los Angeles, Louisville, Madison, Madrid, Melbourne/Orlando, Memphis, Mexico City–Benito Juárez, Miami, Milan–Malpensa, Milwaukee, Minneapolis/St. Paul, Mobile–Regional, Montego Bay, Monterrey, Montréal–Trudeau, Munich, Myrtle Beach, Nashville, Nassau, New Orleans, New York–JFK, New York–LaGuardia, Newark, Norfolk, Oklahoma City, Omaha, Ontario, Orange County, Orlando, Panama City (FL), Panama City–Tocumen, Paris–Charles de Gaulle, Pensacola, Philadelphia, Phoenix–Sky Harbor, Pittsburgh, Portland (ME), Portland (OR), Providence, Providenciales, Puerto Plata, Puerto Vallarta, Punta Cana, Quito, Raleigh/Durham, Reno/Tahoe, Richmond, Rio de Janeiro–Galeão, Roanoke, Roatán, Rochester (NY), Rome–Fiumicino, Sacramento, St. Louis, St. Lucia–Hewanorra, Sint Maarten, St. Thomas, Salt Lake City, San Antonio, San Diego, San Francisco, San Jose (CA), San José (CR), San José del Cabo, San Juan, San Pedro Sula, San Salvador, Santiago de Chile, Santo Domingo–Las Américas, São Paulo–Guarulhos, Sarasota, Savannah, Seattle/Tacoma, Seoul–Incheon, Sioux Falls, Spokane, Springfield/Branson, Syracuse, Tallahassee, Tampa, Tel Aviv, Tokyo–Haneda, Toronto–Pearson, Tucson, Tulsa, Tulum, Washington–Dulles, Washington–National, West Palm Beach, White Plains, Wichita, Wilmington (NC); Seasonal: Accra, Athens, Bangor, Charlottesville (VA), Cozumel, Eagle/Vail, Edinburgh, Hayden/Steamboat Springs, Jackson Hole, Kahului, Marrakesh, Montrose, Naples, Nice, Palm Springs, St. Croix, St. Kitts, Venice, Zurich
Delta Connection	Albany (GA), Alexandria (LA), Allentown, Asheville, Aspen, Augusta (GA), Baton Rouge, Bloomington/Normal, Brunswick, Charleston (WV), Charlottesville (VA), Chattanooga, Columbia (SC), Columbus (GA), Columbus (MS), Dothan, Evansville, Fargo, Fayetteville/Bentonville, Fayetteville (NC), Fort Wayne, Gainesville, George Town, Huntsville, Jackson (MS), Jacksonville (NC), Knoxville, Lafayette, Lexington, Marsh Harbour, Mobile–Regional, Moline/Quad Cities, Monroe, Montgomery, North Eleuthera, Roanoke, Shreveport, South Bend, Springfield/Branson, Tallahassee, Tri-Cities (TN), Valdosta, White Plains, Wilmington (NC); Seasonal: Harrisburg, Hilton Head
Denver Air Connection	Greenville (MS), Jackson (TN)
Ethiopian Airlines	Addis Ababa
Etihad Airways	Abu Dhabi
Frontier Airlines	Austin, Baltimore, Boston, Buffalo, Cancún, Chicago–Midway, Chicago–O'Hare, Cincinnati, Cleveland, Columbus–Glenn, Dallas/Fort Worth, Denver, Detroit, Fort Lauderdale, Fort Myers, Guatemala City, Hartford, Houston–Intercontinental, Indianapolis, Jacksonville (FL), Kansas City, Las Vegas, Los Angeles, Miami, Minneapolis/St. Paul, Montego Bay, New York–LaGuardia, Newark, Norfolk, Omaha, Orlando, Philadelphia, Phoenix–Sky Harbor, Raleigh/Durham, Richmond, St. Louis, San Antonio, San Francisco, San José (CR), San Juan, San Salvador, Tampa, Washington–Dulles, West Palm Beach; Seasonal: Grand Rapids, Punta Cana
JetBlue	Boston, Fort Lauderdale, New York–JFK
KLM	Amsterdam
Korean Air	Seoul–Incheon
LATAM Perú	Lima
Lufthansa	Frankfurt
Qatar Airways	Doha
Scandinavian Airlines	Copenhagen
Southwest Airlines	Austin, Baltimore, Chicago–Midway, Columbus–Glenn, Dallas–Love, Denver, Houston–Hobby, Indianapolis, Kansas City, Las Vegas, Nashville, New Orleans, Orlando, Phoenix–Sky Harbor, Pittsburgh, St. Louis, San Antonio, Tampa, Washington–National
Sun Country Airlines	Seasonal: Minneapolis/St. Paul
Turkish Airlines	Istanbul
United Airlines	Chicago–O'Hare, Denver, Houston–Intercontinental, Newark, San Francisco, Washington–Dulles
United Express	Houston–Intercontinental; Seasonal: Newark, Washington–Dulles
Virgin Atlantic	London–Heathrow, Manchester (UK)
Volaris	Guadalajara (begins December 1, 2026)
WestJet	Calgary, Vancouver

=== Cargo ===
Airlines	Destinations	Refs
AeroLogic	Frankfurt	
AirZeta	Seoul–Incheon	
DHL Aviation	Charleston (SC), Cincinnati, Jacksonville (FL), Pensacola, Savannah	
FedEx Express	Fort Worth/Alliance, Greensboro, Indianapolis, Memphis, Newark; Seasonal: Oakland	

== Statistics ==
=== Top destinations ===
Busiest domestic routes from ATL (September 2025 – August 2026)
Rank	Airport	Passengers	Airlines
1	Orlando, Florida	1,356,700	Delta, Frontier, Southwest, Spirit
2	Fort Lauderdale, Florida	1,152,529	Delta, Frontier, JetBlue, Spirit
3	New York–LaGuardia, New York	1,090,256	American, Delta, Frontier, Southwest
4	Tampa, Florida	995,397	Delta, Frontier, Southwest, Spirit
5	Dallas/Fort Worth, Texas	969,007	American, Delta, Frontier, Spirit
6	Miami, Florida	951,301	American, Delta, Frontier, Spirit
7	Los Angeles, California	878,854	American, Delta, Frontier, Spirit
8	Newark, New Jersey	867,763	Delta, Frontier, Spirit, United
9	Denver, Colorado	846,056	Delta, Frontier, Southwest, United
10	Las Vegas, Nevada	814,502	Delta, Frontier, Southwest, Spirit

Busiest international routes from ATL (September 2025 – August 2026)
Rank	Airport	Passengers	Carriers
1	Amsterdam, Netherlands	778,509	Delta, KLM
2	London–Heathrow, United Kingdom	755,375	British Airways, Delta, Virgin Atlantic
3	Paris–Charles de Gaulle, France	744,493	Air France, Delta
4	Cancún, Mexico	731,661	Delta, Frontier
5	Seoul–Incheon, South Korea	586,132	Delta, Korean Air
6	Toronto–Pearson, Canada	484,859	Air Canada, Delta
7	Mexico City, Mexico	460,478	Delta
8	Punta Cana, Dominican Republic	421,388	Delta, Frontier
9	Montego Bay, Jamaica	368,794	Delta, Frontier
10	Lima, Peru	328,198	Delta, LATAM Peru

=== Airline market share ===
Largest airlines at ATL (August 2025 - September 2026)
Rank	Airline	Passengers	Share
1	Delta Air Lines (includes Delta Connection)	85,009,687	80.29%
2	Frontier Airlines	7,135,330	6.74%
3	Southwest Airlines	3,871,271	3.66%
4	American Airlines (includes American Eagle)	2,658,779	2.51%
5	United Airlines	1,936,211	1.83%
6	Spirit Airlines	970,799	0.92%
7	JetBlue	681,524	0.64%
8	Alaska Airlines	401,372	0.38%
9	Air France	367,115	0.35%
10	Virgin Atlantic	335,401	0.32%
	Other	2,517,835	2.38%

=== Annual traffic ===
Traffic by calendar year
	Passengers	Change from previous year	Aircraft operations	Cargo tonnage
2000	78,092,940	▲2.77%	N/A	935,892
2001	80,162,407	▲2.65%	915,454	865,991
2002	75,858,500	▼5.37%	890,494	735,796
2003	76,876,128	▲1.34%	889,966	734,083
2004	79,087,928	▲2.88%	911,727	802,248
2005	83,606,583	▲5.71%	964,858	862,230
2006	85,907,423	▲2.75%	980,386	767,897
2007	84,846,639	▼1.23%	976,447	746,502
2008	89,379,287	▲5.34%	994,346	720,209
2009	90,039,280	▲0.74%	978,824	655,277
2010	88,001,381	▼2.23%	970,235	563,139
2011	92,389,023	▲3.53%	923,996	659,129
2012	94,956,643	▲3.10%	952,767	684,576
2013	94,431,224	▼1.13%	911,074	616,365
2014	96,178,899	▲1.85%	868,359	601,270
2015	101,491,106	▲5.52%	882,497	626,201
2016	104,258,124	▲2.73%	898,356	648,595
2017	103,902,992	▼0.26%	879,560	685,338
2018	107,394,029	▲3.33%	895,682	693,790
2019	110,531,300	▲2.92%	904,301	639,276
2020	42,918,685	▼61.17%	548,016	599,179
2021	75,704,760	▲76.00%	707,661	734,771
2022	93,699,630	▲23.77%	724,145	688,614
2023	104,653,451	▲11.69%	775,818	579,331
2024	108,067,766	▲3.26%	796,224	645,834
2025	106,302,208	▼1.63%	805,268	640,494
Source: Hartsfield–Jackson Atlanta International Airport

=== On-time performance (domestic major U.S. carriers only) ===
On-time performance by calendar year
Year	Percent of on time departures	Percent of on time arrivals	Average departure delay (min)	Average arrival delay (min)	Percent of cancelled flights
2019	82%	85%	59.43	69.23	0.61%
2020	87%	87%	56.49	69.05	4.69%
2021	85%	88%	55.02	67.94	0.67%
2022	79%	82%	59.10	71.70	1.57%
2023	78%	82%	60.73	75.74	0.82%
2024	79%	82%	64.73	76.70	1.00%

== Accidents and incidents ==
- On May 23, 1960, Delta Air Lines Flight 1903, a Convair CV-880-22-1 (N8804E), crashed on takeoff resulting in the loss of all four crew members. This flight was a training flight for two Delta captains who were being type-rated on the 880.
- On April 4, 1977, Southern Airways Flight 242 was flying from Huntsville International Airport to Atlanta when hail was ingested into the engines, leading them to fail. Pilot errors and difficult weather forced the pilots to attempt an emergency landing on a highway. Upon touchdown, the aircraft struck several buildings and cars, killing 72 people.
- On January 18, 1990, Eastern Air Lines Flight 111, a Boeing 727, overran a Beechcraft King Air operated by Epps Air Service, based at another Atlanta airport. The King Air had landed and was taxiing when the 727, still at high speed in its landing roll, collided with the aircraft. The larger plane's wing impacted the roof of the smaller. The pilot of the King Air, an Epps charter pilot, was killed, while a passenger survived. No crew or passengers on the Eastern plane were injured.
- On November 1, 1998, AirTran Airways Flight 867, a Boeing 737, lost control and skidded off of the runway while landing, with main landing gear in a drainage ditch and its empennage extending over the taxiway. The nose gear was folded back into the electrical/electronic compartment and turned 90 degrees from its normal, extended position. The cause was an improperly repaired hydraulic line leak that caused the flight crew to lose control of the airplane.

== In popular culture ==
The airport was seen in the 2018 Channel 5 documentary The Secret Life of the World's Busiest Airport.

== See also ==
- Atlanta's second airport
- Candler Field Museum
- Flight Path, a book about the airport
- Georgia World War II Army Airfields
- List of airports with triple takeoff/landing capability
- List of busiest airports by aircraft movements
- List of busiest airports by cargo traffic
- List of busiest airports by international passenger traffic
- List of busiest airports by passenger traffic
- List of tallest air traffic control towers in the United States
- List of the busiest airports in the United States
- List of the busiest airports
