= List of driverless train systems =

This is a list of driverless train systems, which are capable of GoA3 and GoA4 (GoA3+) according to the Grade of Automation classifications specified by the standard IEC 62290‐1. These are explained diagrammatically by the UITP. This list focuses heavily on trains in the classical sense used for large-scale railways for passengers and freight but does include a few people mover systems. For a similar list for GoA2, see list of semi-automatic train systems.

== Grade-of-Automation 3 systems ==
These systems are capable of driverless train operation (DTO), but a train attendant operates the doors and drives the train in case of emergencies.

=== GoA3 – Americas ===
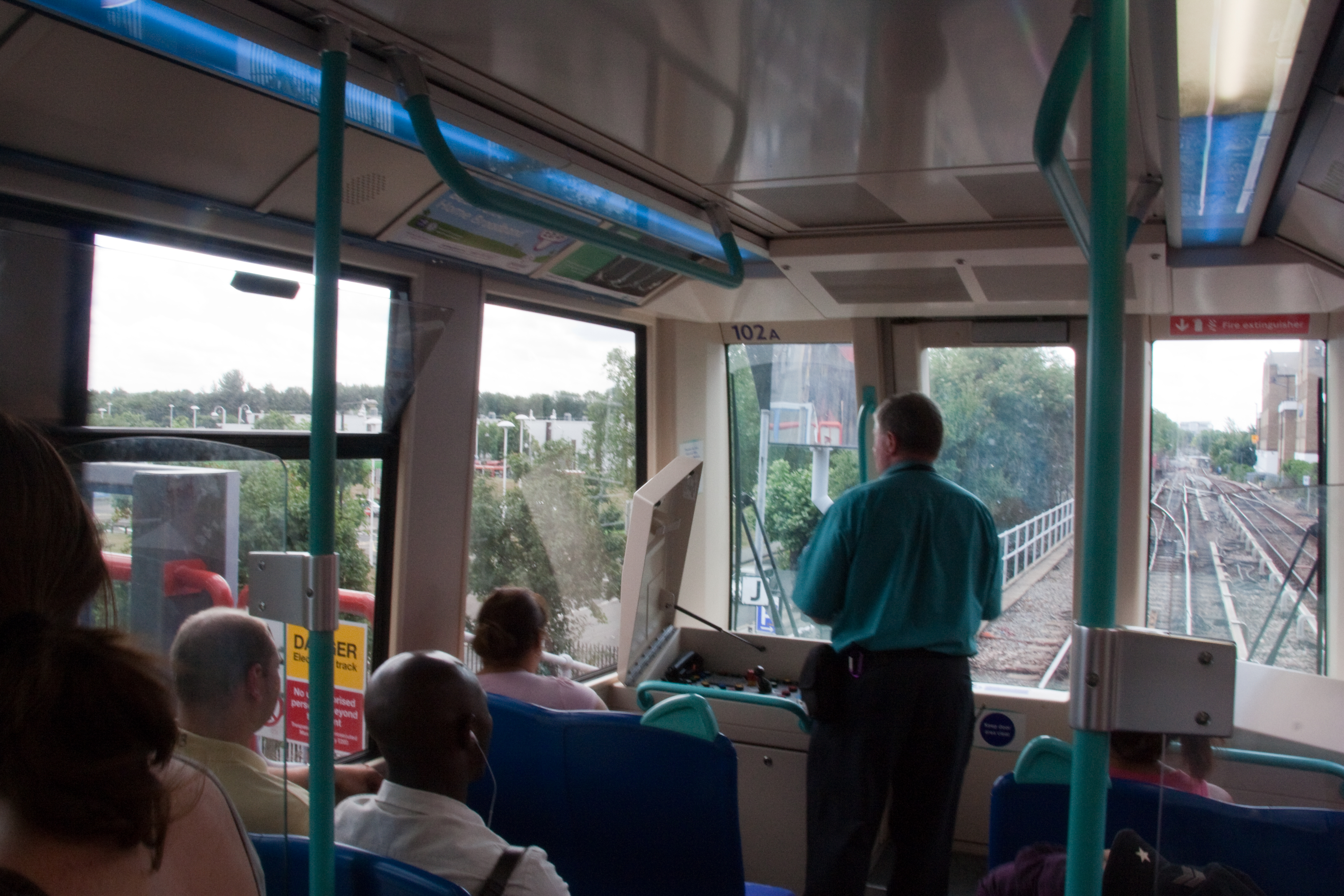
Whereas Docklands Light Railway trains are driverless and do not have a separate cab, there is provision for manual operation

Country/region	Name of system	Line	Date	System	Notes
Brazil	Salvador Metro	Line 1	2014	SelTrac	(Note: With train captains monitoring in cab)
Brazil	Salvador Metro	Line 2	2016	SelTrac	(Note: With train captains monitoring in cab)
Brazil	São Paulo Metro	Line 3 (Red)	2009+	ATO	(Note: With train captains monitoring in cab)
United States	Walt Disney World Monorail System		2016	SelTrac	

=== GoA3 – Asia ===
Country/region	Name of system	Line	Date	System	Notes
China (Mainland)	Beijing Subway	Capital Airport Express	19 July 2008	Alstom Urbalis 400	
China (Mainland)	Fuzhou Metro	Line 4	27 August 2023		
China (Mainland)	Ningbo Rail Transit	Line 7	1 December 2024	CASCO Urbalis 888	
China (Mainland)	Ningbo Rail Transit	Line 12	22 September 2026	BTCT	
China (Mainland)	Shanghai Pudong Airport APM		16 September 2019	FITSCO JeRail	
China (Mainland)	Shanghai Metro	Line 2	Around 2025		Recent upgrades allows DTO/GoA3 operations.
China (Mainland)	Shanghai Metro	Line 5	June 2018	Thales, Shanghai Electric TSTCBTC2.0	Initially operated in GoA1 (Manual operation) (Note: UTO system jointly developed by Thales Group and Shanghai Electric.)
China (Mainland)	Shanghai Metro	Line 17	30 December 2017	CASCO TRANAVI	
China (Mainland)	Wuhan Metro	Yangluo line	26 December 2017	CASCO	
Indonesia	Soekarno–Hatta Airport Skytrain		2020	SiLSafe 5000	(Note: Previously operated in manual mode)
Japan	Disney Resort Line		27 July 2001		
Pakistan	Lahore Metro	Orange Line	25 October 2020	CASCO (Alstom)	
Singapore	Sentosa Express		November 2017	Hitachi Moving Block Wireless CBTC	

=== GoA3 – Europe ===
Country/region	Name of system	Line	Date	System	Notes
Czech Republic		Dolní Bousov–Kopidlno railway line	2025		Commercial operation (limited weekend operation during the tourist season) on AŽD Praha test line
Russia	Trams in Moscow	Tram line 10	2025	71-911	
Spain	Barcelona Metro	Line 11	2009	Siemens Trainguard MT CBTC	
United Kingdom	Docklands Light Railway		31 August 1987	SelTrac	(Note: To be converted to GoA4)

== Grade-of-Automation 4 systems ==
These systems are capable of unattended train operation (UTO), although some operators may choose to staff trains anyway.

=== GoA4 – Americas ===
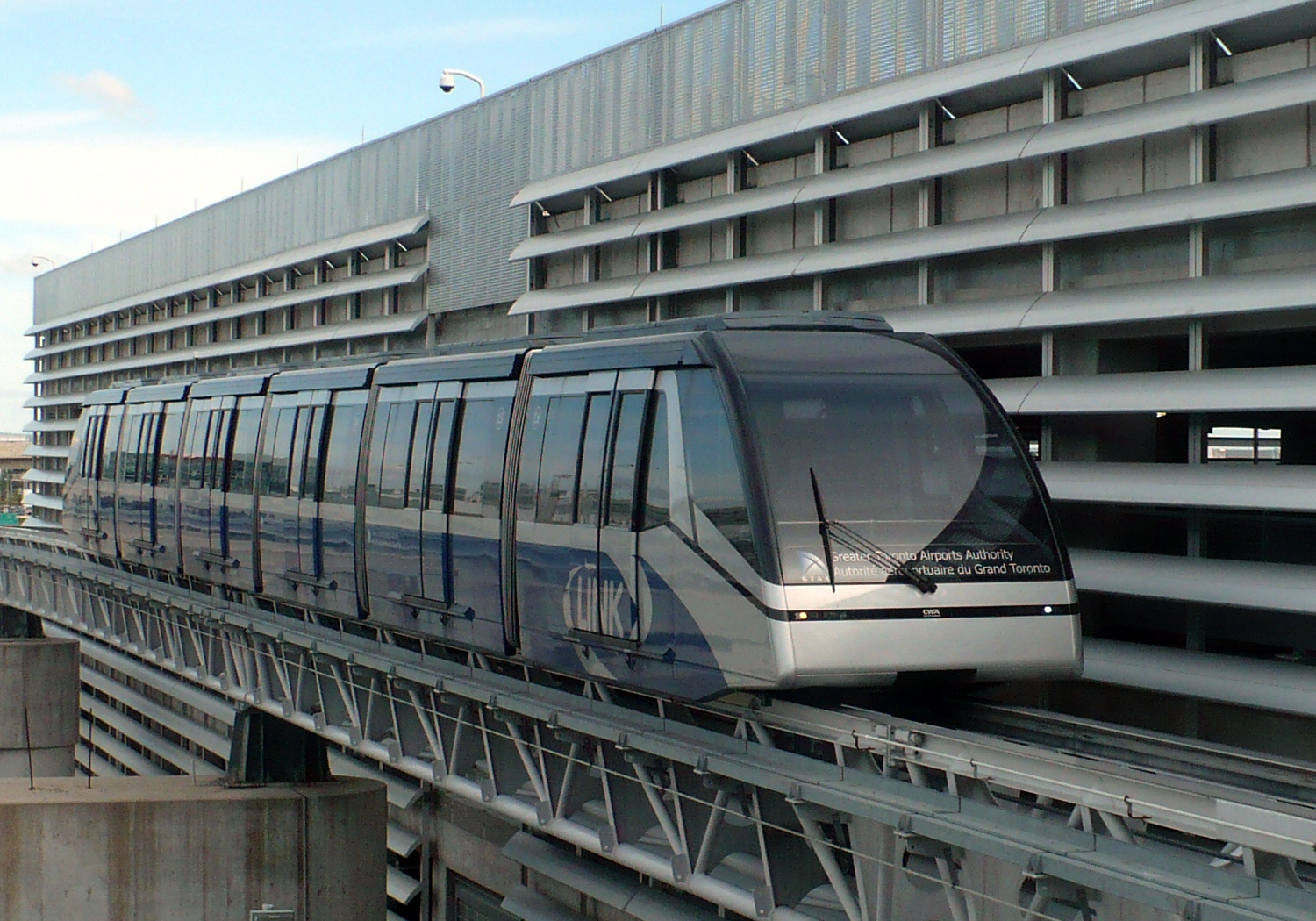
GTAA LINK

Country/region	Name of system	Line	Date	System	Notes
Brazil	Porto Alegre Metro	Metro-Airport Connection	10 August 2013	Aeromovel	
Brazil	São Paulo Metro	Line 1 (Blue)	3 July 2022	Alstom Urbalis CBTC	
Brazil	São Paulo Metro	Line 2 (Green)	2 March 2020	Alstom Urbalis CBTC	
Brazil	São Paulo Metro	Line 3 (Red)	December 2022 (Under Conversion)	Alstom Urbalis CBTC	
Brazil	São Paulo Metro	Line 4 (Yellow)	25 May 2010	Siemens Trainguard MT CBTC	First completely driverless metro line in Latin America.
Brazil	São Paulo Metro	Line 5 (Lilac)	12 March 2017	Bombardier CITYFLO 650	(Note: With train captains monitoring in cab.)
Brazil	São Paulo Metro	Line 15 (Silver)	30 August 2014	Bombardier CITYFLO 650	
Brazil	São Paulo Metro	Line 17 (Gold)	31 March 2026	SelTrac	
Canada	Terminal Link		6 July 2006	DCC Doppelmayr Cable Car	
Canada	SkyTrain (Vancouver)	Expo Line	11 December 1985	SelTrac	The longest driverless network in the Americas, at 79.6 km.
Canada	SkyTrain (Vancouver)	Millennium Line	7 January 2002	SelTrac	The longest driverless network in the Americas, at 79.6 km.
Canada	SkyTrain (Vancouver)	Canada Line	17 August 2009	SelTrac	The longest driverless network in the Americas, at 79.6 km.
Canada	REM (Réseau Express Metropolitain)		31 July 2023 (Partially opened; rest of the line under construction)	Alstom Urbalis 400	
Chile	Santiago Metro	Line 3	22 January 2019	Thales SelTrac	
Chile	Santiago Metro	Line 6	2 November 2017	Thales SelTrac	
Mexico	Aerotrén		2007	DCC Doppelmayr Cable Car	
Peru	Lima Metro	Line 2	21 December 2023	AnsaldoBreda Driverless Metro / Ansaldo STS CBTC	
United States	AeroTrain		20 January 2010	Mitsubishi Crystal Mover / Thales SelTrac	
United States	Airport Transit System		6 May 1993	VAL system	
United States	AirTrain JFK		17 December 2003	SelTrac	
United States	AirTrain Newark		31 May 1996	SelTrac	
United States	AirTrain SFO		24 February 2003	Bombardier CITYFLO 650	
United States	Aria Express		1 December 2009	DCC Doppelmayr Cable Car	
United States	Bay Area Rapid Transit	Oakland Airport Connector	22 November 2014	DCC Doppelmayr Cable Car	
United States	Cincinnati Airport People Mover		9 June 1994	Otis Hovair	
United States	Detroit People Mover		31 July 1987	SelTrac	
United States	DFW Skylink		21 May 2005	Bombardier CITYFLO 650	
United States	DIA Automated Guideway Transit System		28 February 1995	Bombardier CITYFLO 650	
United States	ExpressTram		24 February 2002	Otis Hovair	
United States	George Bush Intercontinental Airport People Movers	Skyway	24 May 1999	Bombardier CITYFLO 550	
United States	George Bush Intercontinental Airport People Movers	Subway	1969	WEDway	(Note: Rebuilt in 1981)
United States	Getty Center Tram		1997	Otis Hovair	
United States	Hartsfield–Jackson Atlanta International Airport People Movers	The Plane Train	21 September 1980	Bombardier CITYFLO 550	
United States	Hartsfield–Jackson Atlanta International Airport People Movers	ATL Skytrain	8 December 2009	Mitsubishi Crystal Mover / Kyosan	
United States	Skyline (Honolulu)		30 June 2023	Hitachi Rail Italy Driverless Metro / DTG	
United States	Huntsville Hospital Tram System		19 June 2002	Otis Hovair	
United States	Jacksonville Skyway		1989	SelTrac	
United States	Las Vegas Monorail		2004	SelTrac	
United States	Mandalay Bay Tram		9 April 1999	DCC Doppelmayr Cable Car	
United States	Harry Reid International Airport Automated People Movers	Green Line	1985	Bombardier CITYFLO 650	
United States	Harry Reid International Airport Automated People Movers	Blue Line	1998	Bombardier CITYFLO 650	
United States	Harry Reid International Airport Automated People Movers	Red Line	2012	Bombardier CITYFLO 650	
United States	Memphis Suspension Railway		1982		
United States	Miami International Airport People Movers	MIA e Train	1980	MiniMetro	(Note: Rebuilt in 2016)
United States	Miami International Airport People Movers	Skytrain	15 September 2010	Mitsubishi Crystal Mover	
United States	Miami International Airport People Movers	MIA Mover	9 September 2011	Mitsubishi Crystal Mover	
United States	Miami Metromover		17 April 1986	Bombardier CITYFLO 550	
United States	Minneapolis–St. Paul Airport Trams	Hub Tram	3 April 2001	Otis Hovair	
United States	Minneapolis–St. Paul Airport Trams	'C' Concourse People Mover	5 May 2004	Otis Hovair	
United States	Morgantown Personal Rapid Transit		1975	proprietary (1975-2014), SelTrac (2014-present)	
United States	Orlando International Airport People Movers	Airside systems	1981	Mitsubishi Crystal Mover	
United States	Orlando International Airport People Movers	Intermodal Terminal system	2017	Mitsubishi Crystal Mover	
United States	PHX Sky Train		8 April 2013	Bombardier CITYFLO 650	
United States	Pittsburgh International Airport People Mover		1 October 1992	Bombardier CITYFLO 650	
United States	Satellite Transit System		1973	Bombardier CITYFLO 650	
United States	SMF Automated People Mover		6 October 2011	Bombardier CITYFLO 650	
United States	Tampa International Airport People Movers	Airside systems	1971	Bombardier CITYFLO 650	
United States	Tampa International Airport People Movers	Monorail	1991	Bombardier CITYFLO 650	
United States	Tampa International Airport People Movers	SkyConnect	2018	Mitsubishi Crystal Mover / Kyosan APM	
United States	Navajo Mine Railroad			GE E60 electric locomotives	(Note: This railroad is GoA2 capable, able to run a train without any person on board for the entire trip out to the Four Corners Generating Station and back to the mines.)
Venezuela	Cabletren Bolivariano		14 August 2013	DCC Doppelmayr Cable Car	

=== GoA4 – Asia ===
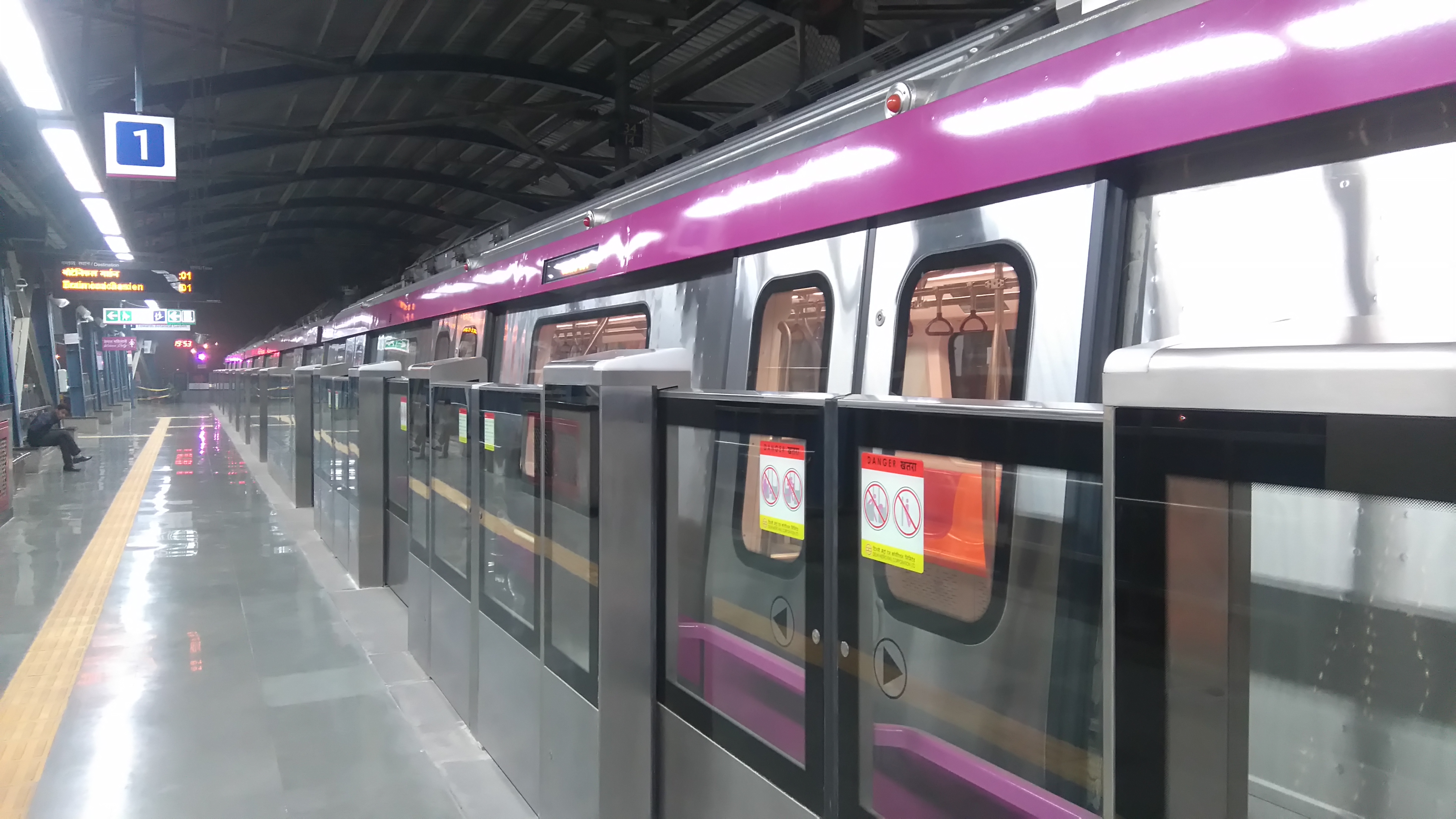
A Magenta Line Train waiting at a station in Delhi

Country/region	Name of system	Line	Date	System	Notes
China (Mainland)	Beijing Capital International Airport Terminal 3 People Mover		March 2008	Bombardier CITYFLO 550	
China (Mainland)	Beijing Subway	Line 3	15 December 2024		
China (Mainland)	Beijing Subway	Line 11	31 December 2021		
China (Mainland)	Beijing Subway	Line 12	15 December 2024		
China (Mainland)	Beijing Subway	Line 17	31 December 2021		
China (Mainland)	Beijing Subway	Line 19	31 December 2021		
China (Mainland)	Beijing Subway	Yanfang line	30 December 2017	BTCT	
China (Mainland)	Beijing Subway	Daxing Airport Express	26 September 2019	BTCT	
China (Mainland)	Chengdu Metro	Line 9	18 December 2020	Alstom Urbalis 400	
China (Mainland)	Chengdu Metro	Line 27	19 December 2024	CASCO Urbalis 888	
China (Mainland)	Chengdu Tianfu Airport Automated People Mover		2021		
China (Mainland)	Chongqing Rail Transit	Bishan rubber-tyred tram	16 April 2021	BYD SkyShuttle	
China (Mainland)	Chongqing Jiangbei International Airport Monorail Rapid Transit System		April 9, 2025		
China (Mainland)	Jinan Metro	Line 2	26 March 2021		
China (Mainland)	Jinan Metro	Line 4	27 December 2025	BTCT	
China (Mainland)	Jinan Metro	Line 8	27 December 2025	BTCT	
China (Mainland)	Jinan Metro	Line 6	27 December 2025	CASCO TRANAVI	
China (Mainland)	Guangzhou Metro	Line 10	29 June 2025	CARS MTC-1	
China (Mainland)	Guangzhou Metro	Line 11	28 December 2024	CARS MTC-1	
China (Mainland)	Guangzhou Metro	Line 12	29 June 2025	CARS MTC-1	
China (Mainland)	Guangzhou Metro	APM Line	8 November 2010	Bombardier CITYFLO 650	
China (Mainland)	Nanjing Metro	Line 7	28 December 2022	Siemens Trainguard MT CBTC	
China (Mainland)	Nanning Metro	Line 5	16 December 2021		
China (Mainland)	Ningbo Rail Transit	Line 5	28 December 2021		
China (Mainland)	Ningbo Rail Transit	Line 6	16 January 2026		
China (Mainland)	Ningbo Rail Transit	Line 7	29 August 2025		
China (Mainland)	Ningbo Rail Transit	Line 8	30 June 2025		
China (Mainland)	Qingdao Metro	Line 6	26 April 2024	FITSCO TACS	
China (Mainland)	Shanghai Metro	Line 10	10 April 2010	Alstom/CASCO Urbalis 888	Initially operated in GoA2 and GoA3, transitioned to GoA4 in 2020
China (Mainland)	Shanghai Metro	Line 14	30 December 2021	Thales, Shanghai Electric TSTCBTC2.0	(Note: UTO system jointly developed by Thales Group and Shanghai Electric.)
China (Mainland)	Shanghai Metro	Line 15	23 January 2021	Alstom Urbalis 400	
China (Mainland)	Shanghai Metro	Line 18	26 December 2020	Alstom Urbalis 400	
China (Mainland)	Shanghai Metro	Pujiang line	31 March 2018	Fitsco JeRail	
China (Mainland)	Shaoxing Metro	Line 2	26 July 2023		
China (Mainland)	Shenzhen Metro	Line 6 Branch	28 November 2022		
China (Mainland)	Shenzhen Metro	Line 12	28 November 2022		
China (Mainland)	Shenzhen Metro	Line 13	28 December 2024		
China (Mainland)	Shenzhen Metro	Line 14	28 October 2022	BTCT	
China (Mainland)	Shenzhen Metro	Line 16	28 December 2022	CASCO Urbalis 888	
China (Mainland)	Shenzhen Metro	Line 20	28 December 2021	CASCO TRANAVI Qiji	
China (Mainland)	Shenzhen Baoan International Airport Automated People Mover		December 2021	Cityflo 650	
China (Mainland)	Shenzhen Pingshan SkyShuttle Line 1		28 December 2022	BYD	
China (Mainland)	Suzhou Metro	Line 5	29 June 2021	Siemens Trainguard MT CBTC	
China (Mainland)	Suzhou Metro	Line 6	29 June 2024	BTCT LCF-300	
China (Mainland)	Suzhou Metro	Line 8	10 September 2024	CASCO Urbalis 888	
China (Mainland)	Suzhou Metro	Line 11	24 June 2023	CASCO Urbalis 888	
China (Mainland)	Taiyuan Metro	Line 2	26 December 2020		
China (Mainland)	Tianjin Metro	Line 7	28 September 2025		
China (Mainland)	Tianjin Metro	Line 8	28 December 2021		
China (Mainland)	Tianjin Metro	Line 10	18 November 2022		
China (Mainland)	Tianjin Metro	Line 11	28 December 2023		
China (Mainland)	Tianjin Metro	Line Z4	18 January 2026		
China (Mainland)	Wuhan Metro	Line 5	26 December 2021		
China (Mainland)	Wuhan Metro	Line 12	1 May 2026	CASCO TRANAVI Qiji	
China (Mainland)	Wuhan Metro	Line 19	30 December 2023		
China (Mainland)	Wuhu Rail Transit	Line 1	3 November 2021		
China (Mainland)	Wuhu Rail Transit	Line 2	28 December 2021		
China (Mainland)	Xi'an Metro	Line 8	26 December 2024		
China (Mainland)	Xi'an Metro	Line 10	26 December 2024		
China (Mainland)	Xi'an Metro	Line 16	27 June 2023	CASCO Urbalis 888	
China (Mainland)	Xi'an Qujiang Sightseeing Monorail		16 January 2015 (closed March 2015); 1 May 2023 (re-opening)		
China (Mainland)	Xiamen Metro	Line 4	16 September 2026		
China (Mainland)	Xiamen Metro	Line 6	16 September 2026		
China (Mainland)	Zhengzhou Metro	Line 10	28 September 2023		
China (Mainland)	Zhengzhou Metro	Line 12	20 December 2023		
China (Mainland)	Zhengzhou Metro	Zhengxu line	28 December 2023		
Egypt	Cairo Monorail	East Nile Line	6 May 2026	Bombardier CITYFLO 650	
Hong Kong	Hong Kong International Airport Automated People Mover		6 July 1998	SelTrac	
Hong Kong	MTR	Disneyland Resort line	1 August 2005	SelTrac	Most trains have an attendant on board
Hong Kong	MTR	South Island line (East)	28 December 2016	Alstom Urbalis 400	All trains have an attendant on board
India	Delhi Metro	Pink Line	14 March 2018	Bombardier CITYFLO 650	58.59 km (36.41 mi). Initially with an attendant on board
India	Delhi Metro	Magenta Line	25 December 2017	Nippon Signal SPARCS	Initially with an attendant on board
India	Delhi Metro	Grey Line	4 October 2019	Bombardier CITYFLO 650	Initially with an attendant on board
India	Mumbai Metro	Line 2	2 April 2022		
India	Mumbai Metro	Line 3	5 October 2024		
India	Mumbai Metro	Line 7	2 April 2022		
India	Navi Mumbai Metro	Line 1	21 December 2023	Ansaldo STS CBTC	
India	Namma Metro	Yellow Line	10 August 2025		
Indonesia	Jabodebek LRT	Bekasi Line	28 August 2023	Siemens Trainguard MT CBTC	(Note: With train attendants to drive trains in the event of a disruption.)
Indonesia	Jabodebek LRT	Cibubur Line	28 August 2023	Siemens Trainguard MT CBTC	(Note: With train attendants to drive trains in the event of a disruption.)
Japan	Kanazawa Seaside Line		5 July 1989		
Japan	Kobe New Transit	Port Island Line	5 February 1981		World's first GoA4 line
Japan	Kobe New Transit	Rokkō Island Line	21 February 1990		
Japan	Linimo		6 March 2005		World's first unmanned maglev
Japan	Osaka Metro	Nanko Port Town Line	20 October 1991		Previously used GoA2 from 1981 to 1991
Japan	Skyrail Midorizaka Line		28 August 1998		People Mover monorail No longer in operation as of 30 April 2024.
Japan	Tokyo Metropolitan Bureau of Transportation	Nippori-Toneri Liner	30 March 2008		
Japan	Wing Shuttle		4 September 1994		
Japan	Yurikamome		1 November 1995	Mitsubishi Crystal Mover	
Macau	Macau Light Rapid Transit	Taipa Line	10 December 2019	Kyosan APM	
Macau	Macau Light Rapid Transit	Hengqin Line	2 December 2024	Kyosan APM	
Macau	Macau Light Rapid Transit	Seac Pai Van Line	1 November 2024	Kyosan APM	
Malaysia	KLIA Aerotrain		1998	Bombardier CITYFLO 550 (Past) Bombardier CITYFLO 650 (Present)	
Malaysia	Rapid KL	Kelana Jaya Line	1 September 1998	SelTrac	The first GoA4 in Malaysia, at 46.4 km (28.8 mi)
Malaysia	Rapid KL	Kajang Line	16 December 2016	Bombardier CITYFLO 650	The second GoA4, at 47 km (29 mi)
Malaysia	Rapid KL	Ampang Line	2017	SelTrac	(Note: With train attendants to drive trains in the event of a disruption.)
Malaysia	Rapid KL	Sri Petaling Line	2017	SelTrac	(Note: With train attendants to drive trains in the event of a disruption.)
Malaysia	Rapid KL	Putrajaya Line	16 June 2022	Bombardier CITYFLO 650	The fifth GoA4 and the longest in Malaysia, at 57.7 km (35.9 mi)
Malaysia	Rapid KL	Shah Alam Line	29 June 2026	Siemens Trainguard MT CBTC	
Malaysia	Melaka Monorail		4 December 2017		
Kazakhstan	Astana Light Metro	Line 1	16 May 2026		
Pakistan	Lahore Metro	Orange Line	25 October 2020	CRRC Zhuzhou Locomotive	The first driverless metro in Pakistan.
Qatar	Doha Metro	Red Line	8 May 2019	(Past	
Qatar	Doha Metro	Green Line	10 December 2019	(Past	
Qatar	Doha Metro	Gold Line	21 November 2019	(Past	
Qatar	Hamad International Airport Shuttle		2014	DCC Doppelmayr Cable Car	
Saudi Arabia	Princess Nora bint Abdul Rahman University Automated People Mover		2012	AnsaldoBreda Driverless Metro / Ansaldo STS DTG	
Saudi Arabia	Riyadh Metro	Line 1	1 December 2024	Siemens Trainguard MT CBTC	
Saudi Arabia	Riyadh Metro	Line 2	15 December 2024	Siemens Trainguard MT CBTC	
Saudi Arabia	Riyadh Metro	Line 3	5 January 2025	Alstom Urbalis 400	
Saudi Arabia	Riyadh Metro	Line 4	1 December 2024	Alstom Urbalis 400	
Saudi Arabia	Riyadh Metro	Line 5	15 December 2024	Alstom Urbalis 400	
Saudi Arabia	Riyadh Metro	Line 6	1 December 2024	Alstom Urbalis 400	
Singapore	Changi Airport Skytrain		1990	Kyosan APM	(Note: Original system opened in 1990; upgraded to current system in 2006.)
Singapore	Light Rail Transit (Singapore)	Bukit Panjang LRT line	6 November 1999	Bombardier CITYFLO 550	
Singapore	Light Rail Transit (Singapore)	Sengkang LRT line	18 January 2003	Kyosan APM	
Singapore	Light Rail Transit (Singapore)	Punggol LRT line	29 January 2005	Kyosan APM	
Singapore	Mass Rapid Transit (Singapore)	North East MRT line	20 June 2003	Alstom Urbalis 300	(Note: The largest fully automated rapid transit network in the world with 202.4 km (125.8 mi) of automated rail lines. Trains may have an attendant on board. Only North–South line and East–West line has driving cabins.) (Note: North–South and East–West lines were converted from a lower GoA to a higher GoA)
Singapore	Mass Rapid Transit (Singapore)	Circle MRT line	28 May 2009	Alstom Urbalis 300	(Note: The largest fully automated rapid transit network in the world with 202.4 km (125.8 mi) of automated rail lines. Trains may have an attendant on board. Only North–South line and East–West line has driving cabins.) (Note: North–South and East–West lines were converted from a lower GoA to a higher GoA)
Singapore	Mass Rapid Transit (Singapore)	Downtown MRT line	22 December 2013	Siemens Trainguard Sirius CBTC	(Note: The largest fully automated rapid transit network in the world with 202.4 km (125.8 mi) of automated rail lines. Trains may have an attendant on board. Only North–South line and East–West line has driving cabins.) (Note: North–South and East–West lines were converted from a lower GoA to a higher GoA)
Singapore	Mass Rapid Transit (Singapore)	North–South MRT line	2017	Thales SelTrac Convergence CBTC	(Note: The largest fully automated rapid transit network in the world with 202.4 km (125.8 mi) of automated rail lines. Trains may have an attendant on board. Only North–South line and East–West line has driving cabins.) (Note: North–South and East–West lines were converted from a lower GoA to a higher GoA)
Singapore	Mass Rapid Transit (Singapore)	East–West MRT line	18 June 2017 (Tuas West extension); 28 May 2018 (whole line)	Thales SelTrac Convergence CBTC	(Note: The largest fully automated rapid transit network in the world with 202.4 km (125.8 mi) of automated rail lines. Trains may have an attendant on board. Only North–South line and East–West line has driving cabins.) (Note: North–South and East–West lines were converted from a lower GoA to a higher GoA)
Singapore	Mass Rapid Transit (Singapore)	Thomson–East Coast MRT line	31 January 2020	Alstom Urbalis 400	(Note: The largest fully automated rapid transit network in the world with 202.4 km (125.8 mi) of automated rail lines. Trains may have an attendant on board. Only North–South line and East–West line has driving cabins.) (Note: North–South and East–West lines were converted from a lower GoA to a higher GoA)
South Korea	Busan-Gimhae Light Rail Transit		9 September 2011	SelTrac	
South Korea	Busan Metro	Line 4	30 March 2011		
South Korea	Daegu Metro	Line 3	23 April 2015		
South Korea	Incheon Airport Maglev		3 February 2016		
South Korea	Incheon Airport Shuttle train		20 June 2008		
South Korea	Incheon Subway	Line 2	30 July 2016	SelTrac	
South Korea	Seoul Light Rapid Transit	U Line	1 July 2012	VAL system	
South Korea	Seoul Light Rapid Transit	Everline	26 April 2013	Bombardier CITYFLO 650	
South Korea	Seoul Light Rapid Transit	Ui LRT	2 September 2017		
South Korea	Seoul Light Rapid Transit	Gimpo Goldline	28 September 2019	Nippon Signal SPARCS	
South Korea	Seoul Light Rapid Transit	Sillim Line	28 May 2022		
South Korea	Seoul Metropolitan Subway	Shinbundang Line	28 October 2011	SelTrac	
South Korea	Wolmi Sea Train		8 October 2019	Urbanaut	
Taiwan	Taichung MRT	Green line	25 April 2021	Alstom Urbalis 400	
Taiwan	Taipei Metro	Wenhu line	28 March 1996	Bombardier CITYFLO 650	(Note: Previously used VAL) (Note: System started with an attendant on board each train full-time. Gradually over time, the presence of attendants decreased. By September 2017, trains have attendants only while in long tunnel sections.)
Taiwan	New Taipei Metro	Circular line	31 January 2020	AnsaldoBreda Driverless Metro / Ansaldo STS CBTC	Currently operated with attendant on-board
Taiwan	New Taipei Metro	Sanying line	30 June 2026	AnsaldoBreda Driverless Metro / Ansaldo STS CBTC	
Taiwan	Taoyuan International Airport Skytrain		18 January 2003		
Thailand	BTS Skytrain	Gold Line	16 December 2020	Bombardier CITYFLO 650	
Thailand	MRT (Bangkok)	Yellow Line	3 June 2023	Bombardier CITYFLO 650	
Thailand	MRT (Bangkok)	Pink Line	21 November 2023	Bombardier CITYFLO 650	
Turkey	Istanbul Metro	Line M5	15 September 2017		(Note: On the Asian side of Istanbul)
Turkey	Istanbul Metro	Line M7	28 November 2020	Bombardier CITYFLO 650	
Turkey	Istanbul Metro	Line M8	6 January 2023	Bombardier CITYFLO 650	
United Arab Emirates	Dubai International Airport Automated People Mover	Terminal 1 APM	2016		
United Arab Emirates	Dubai International Airport Automated People Mover	Terminal 3 APM	January 2013		
United Arab Emirates	Dubai Metro	Red Line	9 September 2009	SelTrac	(Note: Red Line at 52.1 km (32.4 mi). The longest driverless network in the Middle East.)
United Arab Emirates	Dubai Metro	Green Line	9 September 2011	SelTrac	(Note: Red Line at 52.1 km (32.4 mi). The longest driverless network in the Middle East.)
United Arab Emirates	Palm Jumeirah Monorail		30 April 2009		

=== GoA4 – Europe ===
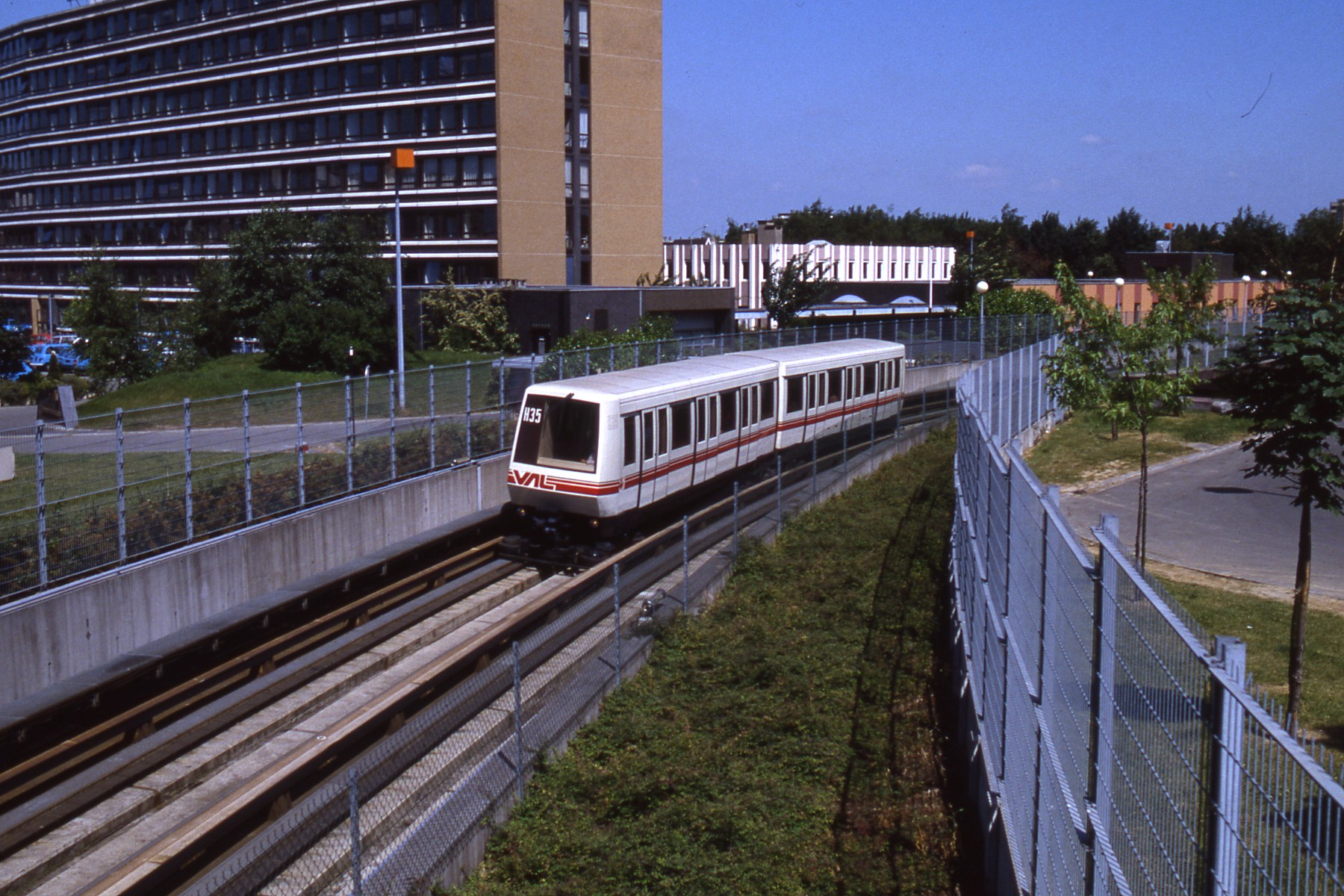
The Lille Metro is operated using fully automated rubber-tyred VAL vehicles

Country/region	Name of system	Line	Date	System	Notes
Denmark	Copenhagen Metro	Line M1	19 October 2002	AnsaldoBreda Driverless Metro / Ansaldo STS DTG	
Denmark	Copenhagen Metro	Line M2	19 October 2002	AnsaldoBreda Driverless Metro / Ansaldo STS DTG	
Denmark	Copenhagen Metro	Line M3	29 September 2019	AnsaldoBreda Driverless Metro / Ansaldo STS DTG	
Denmark	Copenhagen Metro	Line M4	28 March 2020	AnsaldoBreda Driverless Metro / Ansaldo STS DTG	
France	CDGVAL	Line 1	3 April 2007	VAL system	
France	CDGVAL	Line 2	27 June 2007	VAL system	
France	Lille Metro	Line 1	25 April 1983	Alstom Urbalis Fluence	First line to use the VAL system
France	Lille Metro	Line 2	1 April 1989	VAL system	
France	Lyon Metro	Line B	25 June 2022	Alstom Urbalis 400	(Note: Converted from manual to automated operation) (Note: Rubber-tyred trains controlled by a system known as MAGGALY (Métro Automatique à Grand Gabarit de l'Agglomération Lyonnaise).)
France	Lyon Metro	Line D	11 December 1992	Alstom Urbalis 400	(Note: Converted from manual to automated operation) (Note: Rubber-tyred trains controlled by a system known as MAGGALY (Métro Automatique à Grand Gabarit de l'Agglomération Lyonnaise).)
France	Orlyval		2 October 1991	VAL system	
France	Paris Metro	Line 1	3 November 2011	Siemens Trainguard MT CBTC	
France	Paris Metro	Line 4	12 September 2022	Siemens Trainguard MT CBTC	
France	Paris Metro	Line 14	15 October 1998	Siemens Trainguard MT CBTC	
France	Rennes Metro	Line A	15 March 2002	VAL system	
France	Rennes Metro	Line B	20 September 2022	Neoval	
France	Toulouse Metro	Line A	26 June 1993	VAL system	
France	Toulouse Metro	Line B	30 June 2007	VAL system	
Germany	Dortmund H-Bahn		2 May 1984	SIPEM	
Germany	Düsseldorf Airport SkyTrain		1 July 2002	SIPEM	
Germany	Munich Airport Satellite Terminal Shuttle Train		2016	Bombardier CITYFLO 650	
Germany	Nuremberg U-Bahn	Line U2	2 January 2010	Siemens Trainguard LZB 523	
Germany	Nuremberg U-Bahn	Line U3	14 June 2008	Siemens Trainguard LZB 523	
Germany	SkyLine		1994	Bombardier CITYFLO 550 (Terminal 1-2 Shuttle), Neoval (Terminal 1-3 Shuttle)	
Greece	Thessaloniki Metro	Line 1	30 November 2024	AnsaldoBreda Driverless Metro / Ansaldo STS CBTC	
Greece	Thessaloniki Metro	Line 2	27 August 2026	AnsaldoBreda Driverless Metro / Ansaldo STS CBTC	
Hungary	Budapest Metro	Line 4	28 March 2014	Siemens Trainguard MT CBTC	
Italy	Brescia Metro		2 March 2013	AnsaldoBreda Driverless Metro / Ansaldo STS DTG	
Italy	Marconi Express		18 November 2020	Intamin People Mover P30	
Italy	Milan Metro	Line 4	26 November 2022	AnsaldoBreda Driverless Metro / Ansaldo STS CBTC	
Italy	Milan Metro	Line 5	10 February 2013	AnsaldoBreda Driverless Metro / Ansaldo STS DTG	
Italy	Pisa Mover		2017	MiniMetro	
Italy	Rome Metro	Line C	9 November 2014	AnsaldoBreda Driverless Metro / Ansaldo STS DTG	
Italy	SkyBridge		1999		
Italy	Turin Metro	Line M1	4 February 2006	VAL system	(Note: First fully automatic metro in Italy. First section opened for the 2006 Winter Olympics, completed in 2014.)
Italy	Venice People Mover		19 April 2010	DCC Doppelmayr Cable Car	
Russia	Automated Passenger Transportation System		June 2018	DCC Doppelmayr Cable Car	
Spain	Barcelona Metro	Line 9	13 December 2009	Siemens Trainguard MT CBTC	47.8 km (29.7 mi)
Spain	Barcelona Metro	Line 10	10 April 2010	Siemens Trainguard MT CBTC	
Spain	Madrid Barajas Airport People Mover		December 2005	Bombardier CITYFLO 550	
Switzerland	Lausanne Metro	Line M2	27 October 2008	Alstom Urbalis 300	
Switzerland	Skymetro		September 2003	Otis Hovair	
Turkey	Istanbul Metro	Line M7	28 October 2020	Bombardier CITYFLO 650	
Turkey	Istanbul Metro	Line M11	22 January 2023	Aselsan	Initially operated in GoA3, transitioned to GoA4 on 3 January 2024
United Kingdom	AirRail Link		7 March 2003	DCC Doppelmayr Cable Car	
United Kingdom	Gatwick Airport Shuttle Transit		1987	Bombardier CITYFLO 650	
United Kingdom	Heathrow Terminal 5 Transit		2008	Bombardier CITYFLO 650	
United Kingdom	Stansted Airport Transit System		1991	Bombardier CITYFLO 550	
United Kingdom	Luton DART		10 March 2023	DCC Doppelmayr Cable Car	

=== GoA4 – Oceania ===
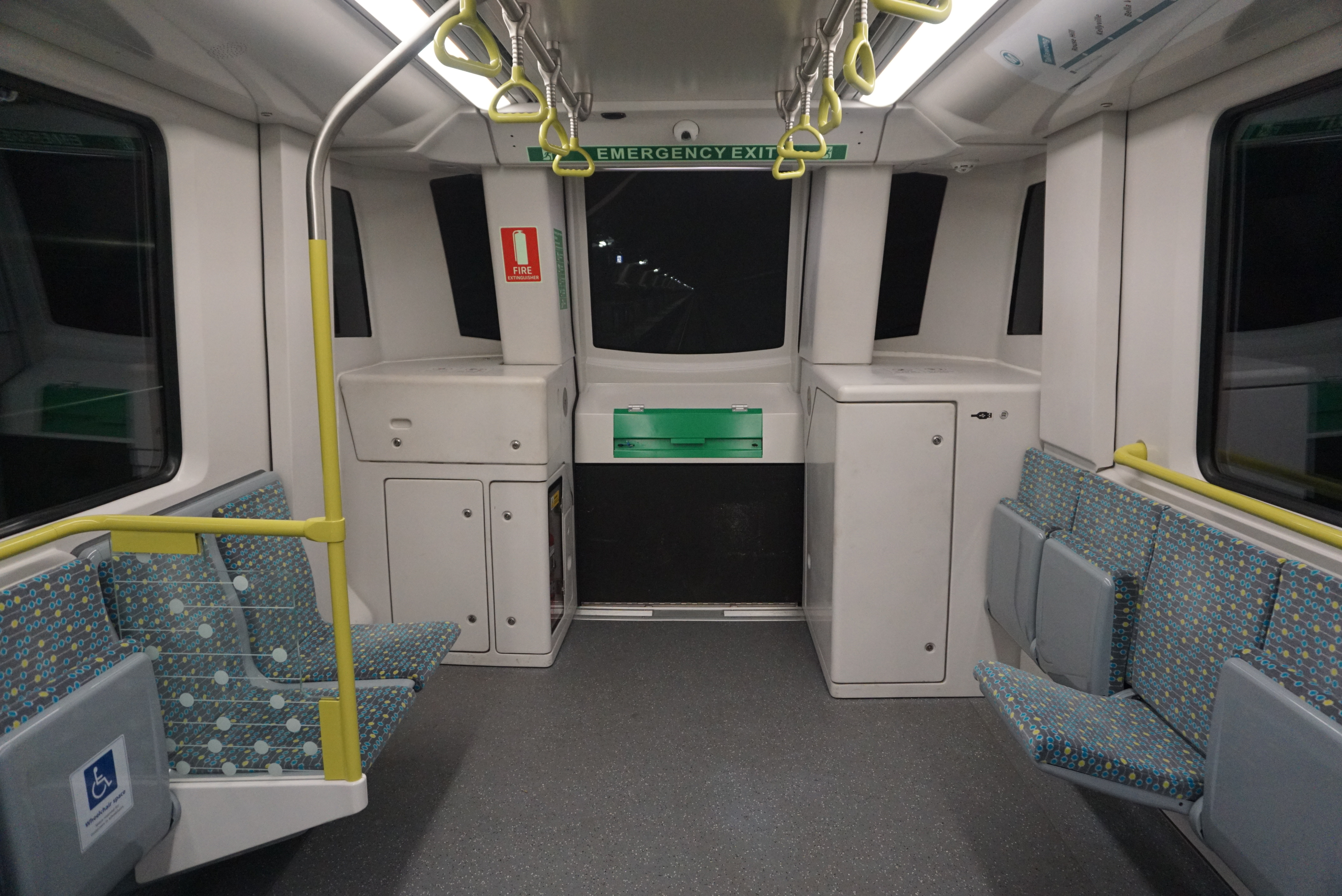
Sydney Metro Alstom Metropolis

Country/region	Name of system	Line	Date	System	Notes
Australia	Rio Tinto	Hamersley & Robe River	28 December 2018	Hitachi AutoHaul	(Note: The Rio Tinto "AutoHaul" system on its iron ore railways in the Pilbara. This system is GoA 4 capable, able to run trains without a single person aboard for the entire trip out to the mines and back to the port. In October 2017 the first fully autonomous test took place over a 100 kilometres (62 mi) section. The group was granted accreditation by Australia's Office of the National Rail Safety Regulator, approving the autonomous operation of iron ore trains in the Pilbara region of Western Australia.)
Australia	Sydney Metro	North West & Bankstown	26 May 2019	Alstom Urbalis 400	(Note: First completely driverless metro line in Australia.)

== Future systems ==
=== Americas ===
Country/region	Name of system	Line	Date	System	Notes
Argentina	Buenos Aires Underground	Line F	2031		
Brazil	Manaus Monorail			SelTrac	
Brazil	São Paulo Metro	Line 6	2027	Nippon Signal SPARCS	(Note: GoA4)
Canada	Toronto Subway	Ontario Line	2031	Hitachi Rail	
Chile	Santiago Metro	Line 7	2028	Alstom Urbalis 400	
Chile	Santiago Metro	Line 8	2032		
Chile	Santiago Metro	Line 9	2030		
Peru	Lima Metro	Line 4	2028	AnsaldoBreda Driverless Metro / Ansaldo STS CBTC	

=== Asia ===
Country/region	Name of system	Line	Date	System	Notes
China (Mainland)	Beijing Subway	Line 22	December 2026		
China (Mainland)	Beijing Subway	Line 28	2029		
China (Mainland)	Ningbo Rail Transit	Line 10	2026		
China (Mainland)	Shanghai Metro	Line 19	2028		
China (Mainland)	Shanghai Metro	Line 20	2029		
China (Mainland)	Shanghai Metro	Line 21	2027		
China (Mainland)	Shanghai Metro	Line 22	December 2026		
China (Mainland)	Shanghai Metro	Line 23	2028		
China (Mainland)	Shenzhen Metro	Line 15	2027-2028		
China (Mainland)	Shenzhen Metro	Line 17	2029		
China (Mainland)	Shenzhen Metro	Line 19	2028		
China (Mainland)	Shenzhen Metro	Line 22	2028		
China (Mainland)	Shenzhen Metro	Line 25	2028		
China (Mainland)	Shenzhen Metro	Line 27	2029		
China (Mainland)	Shenzhen Metro	Line 29	2029		
China (Mainland)	Tianjin Metro	Line B1	December 2026		
China (Mainland)	Tianjin Metro	Line Z2	September 2028		
China (Mainland)	Xiamen Metro	Line 9	2027		
Egypt	Cairo Monorail	West Nile Line	2026	Bombardier CITYFLO 650	
India	Mumbai Metro	Green Line	2027		
India	Mumbai Metro	Orange Line	2027		
India	Mumbai Metro	Pink Line	2028		
India	Mumbai Metro	Gold Line			
India	Mumbai Metro	Purple Line			
India	Mumbai Metro	Magenta Line			
India	Namma Metro	Pink Line	November 2026		
India	Namma Metro	Blue Line	March 2027		
Japan	JR East	Yamanote Line	2028		
Malaysia / Singapore	RTS Link		February 2027		
Singapore	Mass Rapid Transit (Singapore)	Jurong Region Line	2028-2029	Siemens Trainguard MT CBTC	
Singapore	Mass Rapid Transit (Singapore)	Cross Island Line	2030-2032		
South Korea	Busan Metro	Sasang–Hadan Line	2027		
South Korea	Seoul Light Rapid Transit	Dongbuk Line	November 2027		
Taiwan	Taoyuan Metro	Green Line	December 2026	Siemens Trainguard MT CBTC	
Taiwan	Kaohsiung Metro	Yellow Line	2032	Siemens Trainguard MT CBTC	
Thailand	MRT (Bangkok)	Orange Line	2028		
Turkey	Istanbul Metro	Line M12	December 2026	Bombardier CITYFLO 650	(Note: UTO Fully driverless system.)
Turkey	Istanbul Metro	Line M13	2029	Bombardier CITYFLO 650	(Note: UTO Fully driverless system.)
Turkey	Istanbul Metro	Line M14	2027	Bombardier CITYFLO 650	(Note: UTO Fully driverless system.)
Turkey	İzmir Metro	Line M2	2027		

=== Europe ===
Country/region	Name of system	Line	Date	System	Notes
Czech Republic	Prague Metro	Line C	2028-2030		(Note: Upgrade from GoA2 to GoA4)
Czech Republic	Prague Metro	Line D	2031		
Denmark	Copenhagen S-Train		2030-2040	Siemens Trainguard MT CBTC	(Note: Upgrade from GoA2 to GoA4)
France	Lyon Metro	Line A	2035		(Note: Upgrade from GoA2 to GoA4)
France	Marseille Metro	Line 1	2027	Alstom Urbalis 400	(Note: Upgrade from GoA2 to GoA4)
France	Marseille Metro	Line 2	2026	Alstom Urbalis 400	(Note: Upgrade from GoA2 to GoA4)
France	Paris Métro	Line 13	2027–2035	Siemens Trainguard MT CBTC	(Note: Upgrade from GoA2 to GoA4)
France	Paris Métro	Line 15	September 2027	Siemens Trainguard MT CBTC	
France	Paris Métro	Line 16	September 2028	Siemens Trainguard MT CBTC	
France	Paris Métro	Line 17	September 2028	Siemens Trainguard MT CBTC	
France	Paris Métro	Line 18	December 2026	Alstom Urbalis Fluence	
France	Toulouse Metro	Line C	2028	Alstom Urbalis 400	
Greece	Athens Metro	Line 4	2032	Alstom Urbalis 400	
Germany	Hamburg U-Bahn	Line U5 [de}	2029	Alstom Urbalis Fluence	
Ireland	MetroLink (Dublin)		2035		
Italy	Naples Metro	Line 10	2030+	CAF Opito	
Norway	Oslo Metro	Line 6	2027		Will be GoA2 or GoA4, depending on that year...
Spain	Madrid Metro	Line 6	2026-2029	Alstom Urbalis 400	(Note: Conversion from manual to driverless operation)
Spain	Madrid Metro	Line 8	2026-2029		(Note: Conversion from manual to driverless operation)
Sweden	Stockholm Metro	Yellow Line	2034		[56][57]
Switzerland	Appenzell Railways	RhW	2027	Stadler NOVA Pro	
Switzerland	Baselland Transport	Line 19 Waldenburg railway	2030	Stadler NOVA Pro	
United Kingdom	Glasgow Subway		2027	Hitachi Rail STS CBTC	(Note: Upgrade from GoA2 to GoA4 as part of Subway Modernisation.)

=== Oceania ===
Country/region	Name of system	Line	Date	System	Notes
Australia	Sydney Metro	Sydney Metro West	2032		
Australia	Sydney Metro	Western Sydney Airport line	2026	Siemens Trainguard MT CBTC	
Australia	Suburban Rail Loop (Melbourne)	Suburban Rail Loop East	2035	Alstom Urbalis Forward	
