= Kopidlno–Bakov nad Jizerou railway =

The Kopidlno–Bakov nad Jizerou railway line is a single track regional railway line from Kopidlo to Bakov nad Jizerou in the Czech Republic. It was originally built and operated by the Böhmische Commercialbahnen as the Libáň–Bakov nad Jizerou local railway. It branches off from the Jičín–Veleliby line at Kopidlno and runs in the Central Bohemian Region via Dolní Bousov to Bakov nad Jizerou, where it joins the Prague–Turnov line.

According to a decree of the Czech government, the line has been classified as a regional railway (regionální dráha) since 20 December 1995.

== Driverless train operation ==
In 2025, AŽD Praha started a driverless regular train operation between Kopidlno and Dolní Bousov.

== Gallery ==
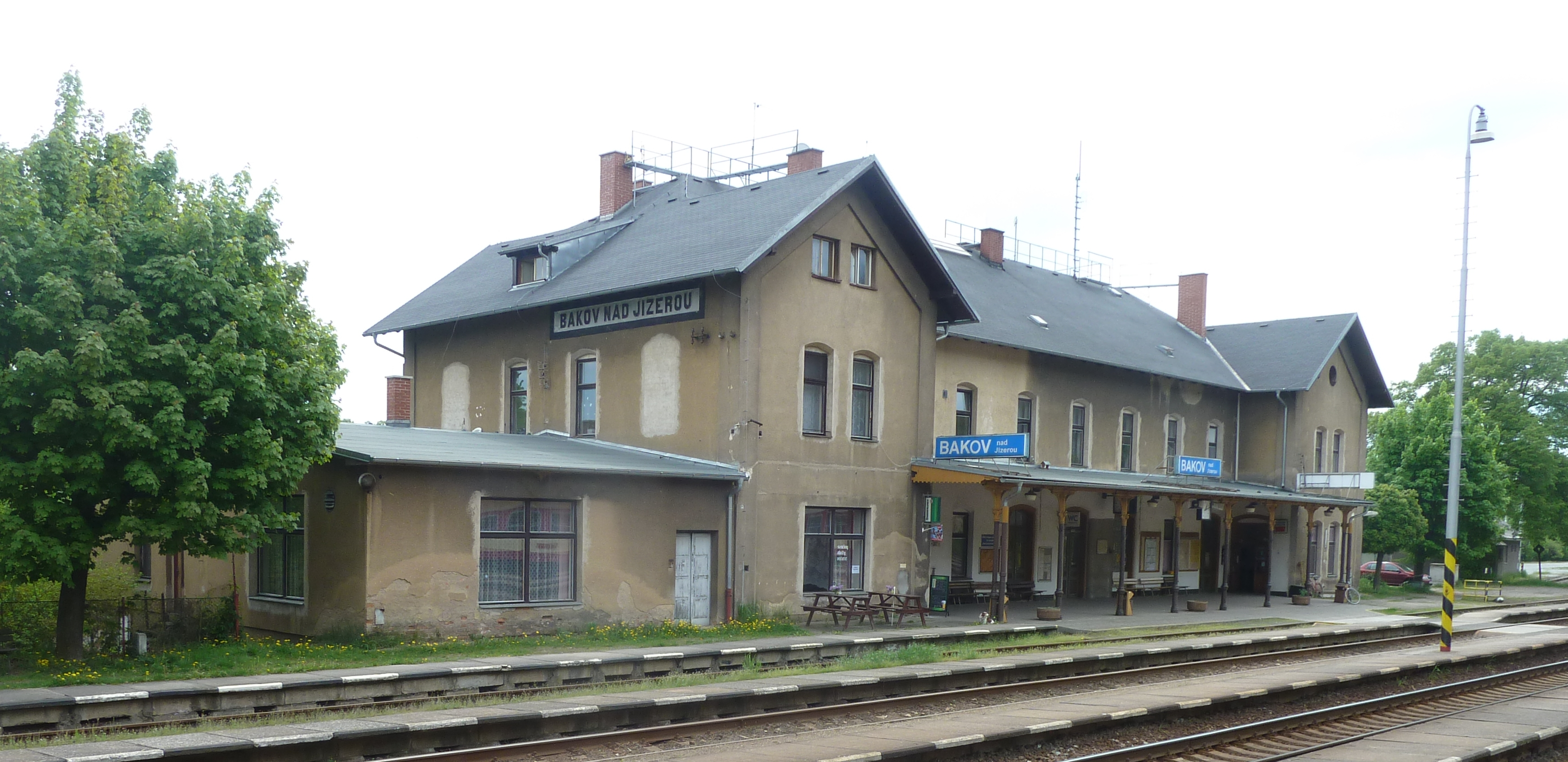
Bakov nad Jizerou

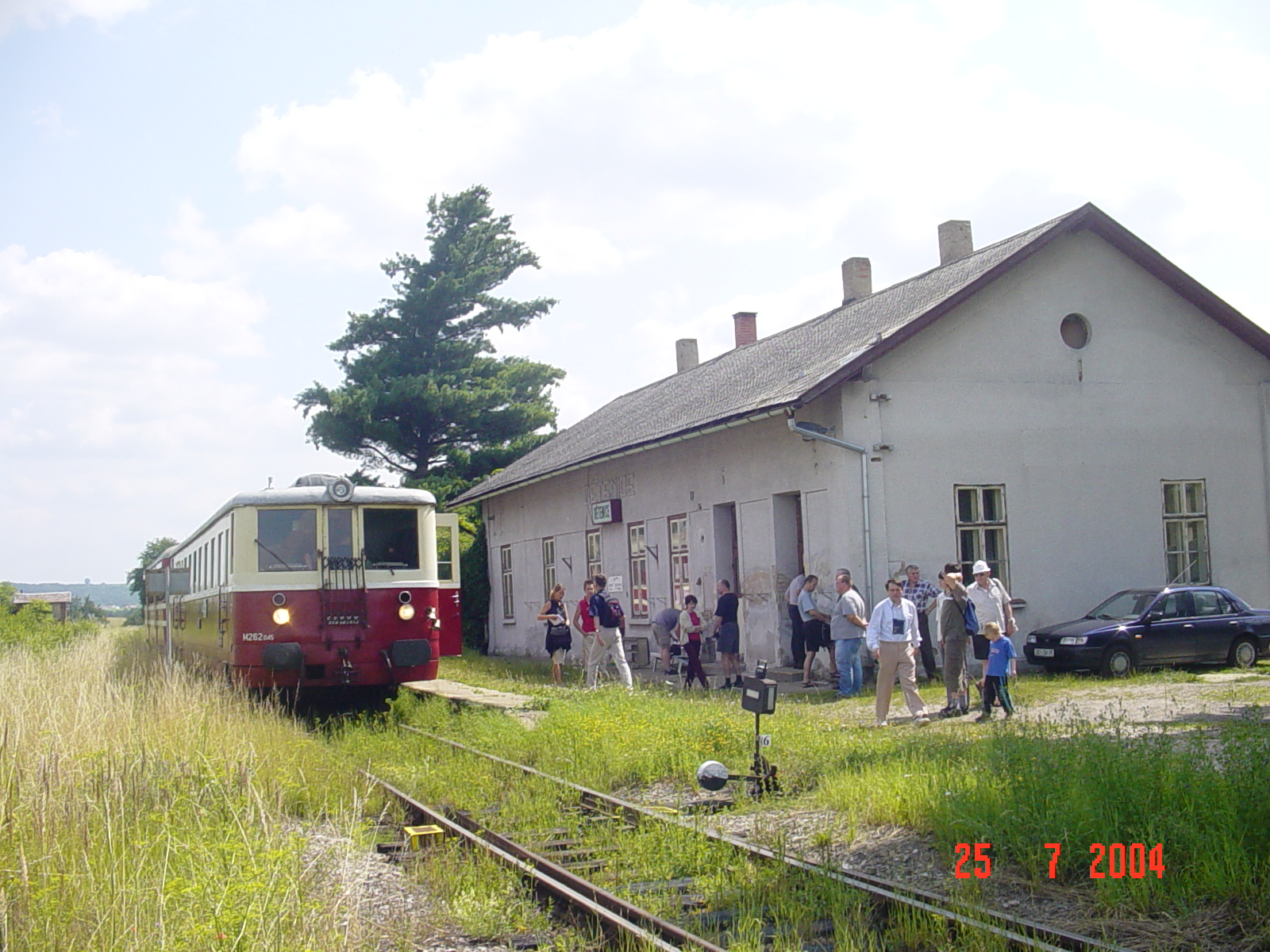
Dětenice

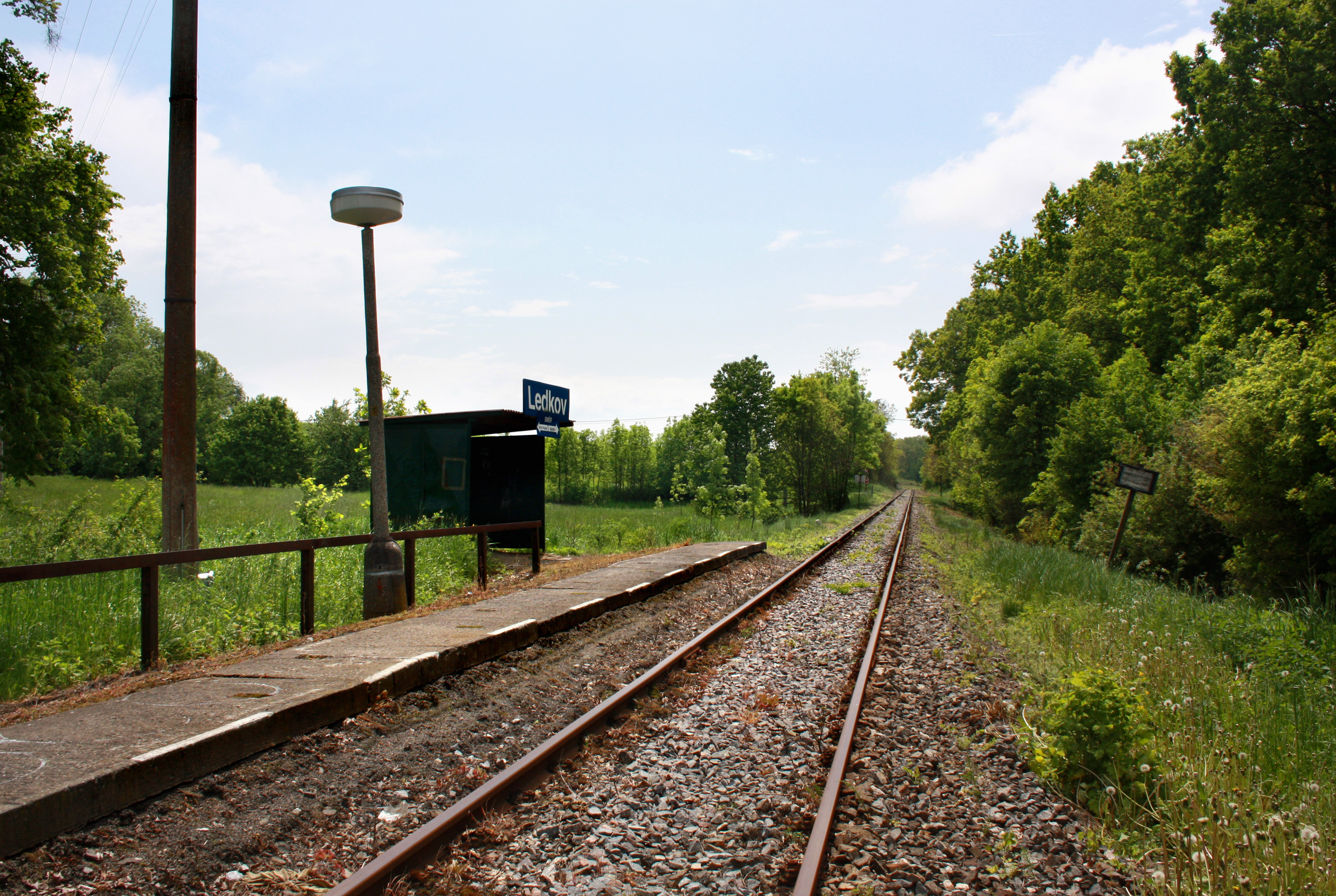
Ledkov

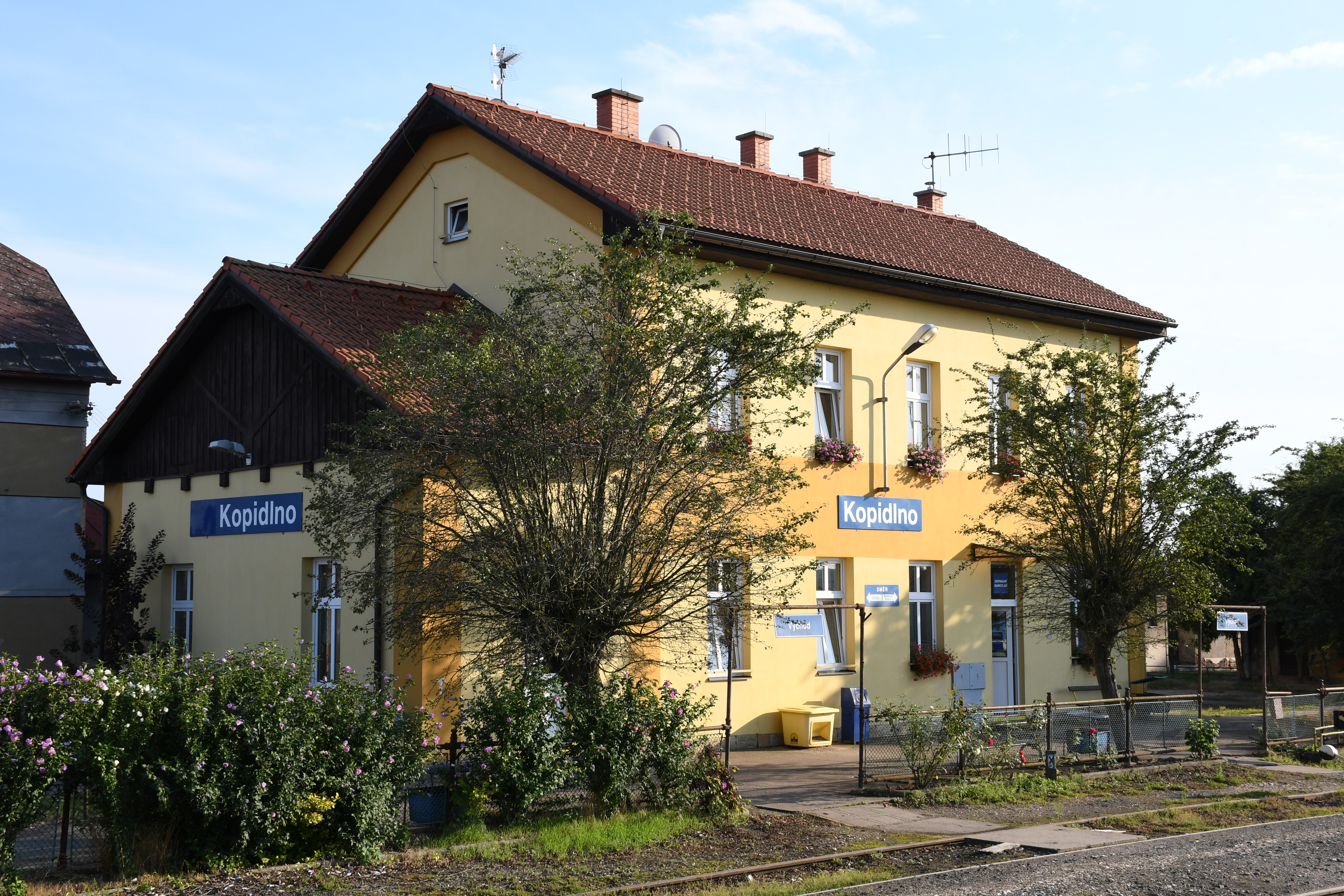
Kopidlno
