= Nanyuan station (Ningbo Rail Transit) =

Metro station in Ningbo, China

Nanyuan 南苑
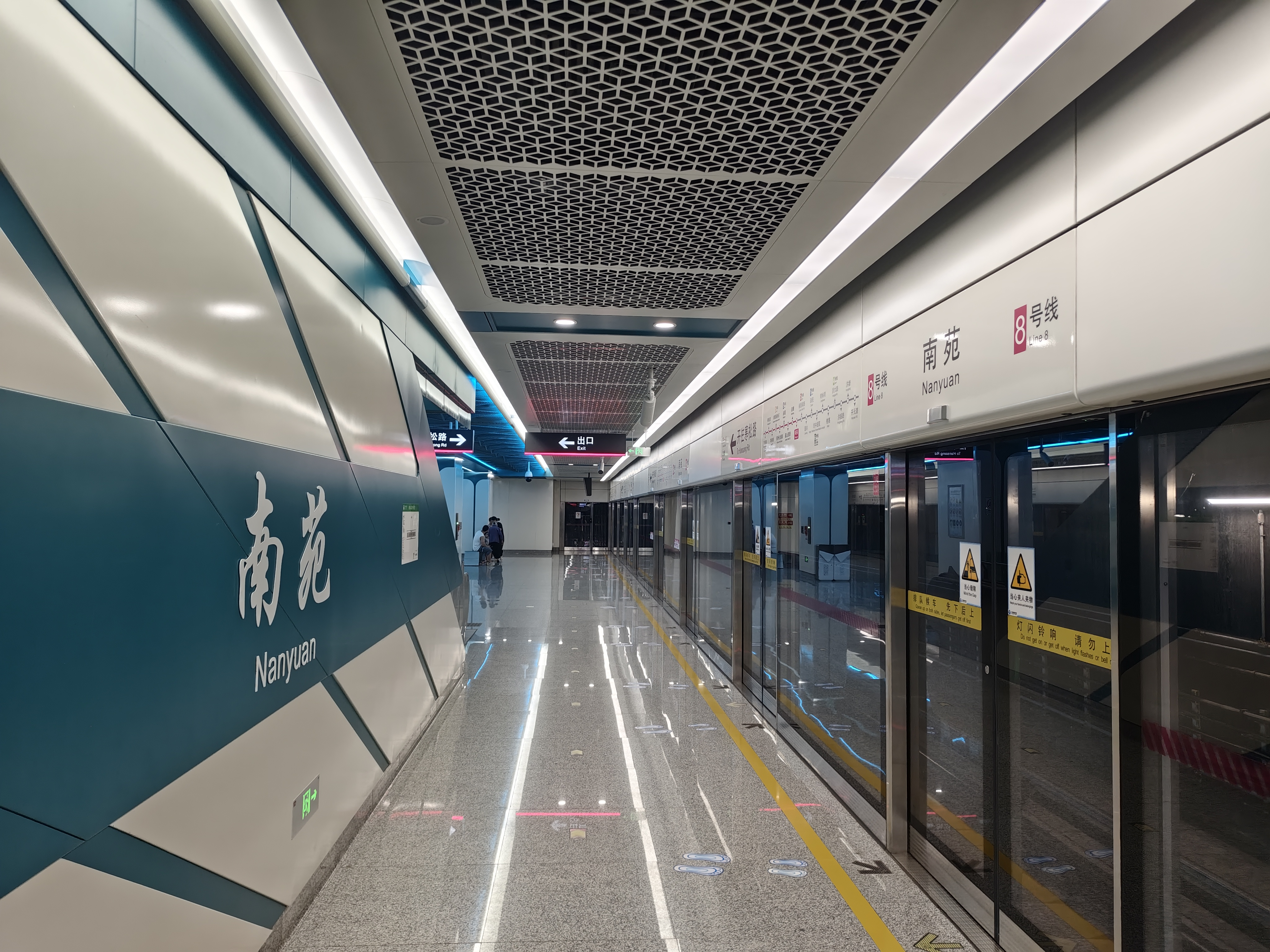
- Platform

Chinese name
- Chinese: 南苑站
Transcriptions
Standard Mandarin
- Hanyu Pinyin: Nányuàn Zhàn

General information
- Location: Huancheng West Road × Huancheng South Road; Duantang Subdistrict, Haishu District, Ningbo, Zhejiang; China
- Coordinates: 29°51′5.96″N 121°31′11.03″E
- System: Ningbo Rail Transit
- Operator: Ningbo Rail Transit Co. Ltd.
- Line: Line 8
- Platforms: 2 (1 island platform)
- Tracks: 2

Construction
- Structure type: Underground
- Accessible: Yes

History
- Opened: 30 June 2025

Services
Preceding station	Ningbo Rail Transit	Following station
Liyuan South Road towards Kaiyuan Road	Line 8	Duantang towards Hansong Road
Location

Nanyuan (Chinese: 南苑) is an underground metro station on Line 8 of Ningbo Rail Transit. It is located on the north side of the intersection of Huancheng West Road and Huancheng South Road in Haishu District, Ningbo, China. The station was opened on 30 June 2025 as part of phase 1 of Line 8.

== Structure ==
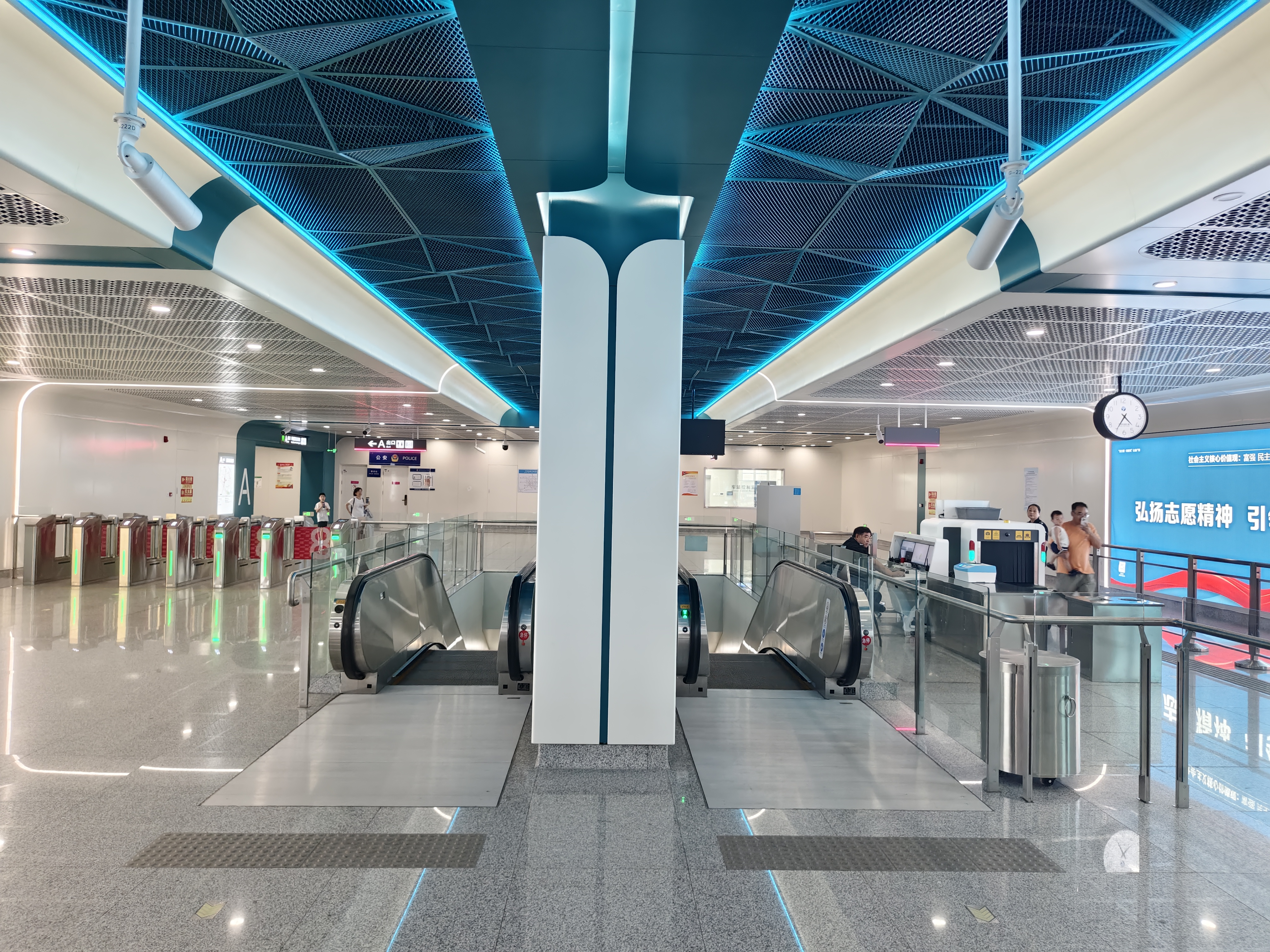
Station concourse

Nanyuan has two levels: a concourse, and an island platform with two tracks for line 8.

== Exits ==
- A: west side of Huancheng West Road, Nanyuan Street (南苑街)
- B: Huancheng South Road, west side of Huancheng West Road
- C: Huancheng South Road, east side of Huancheng West Road, Liangfeng Street (粮丰街)
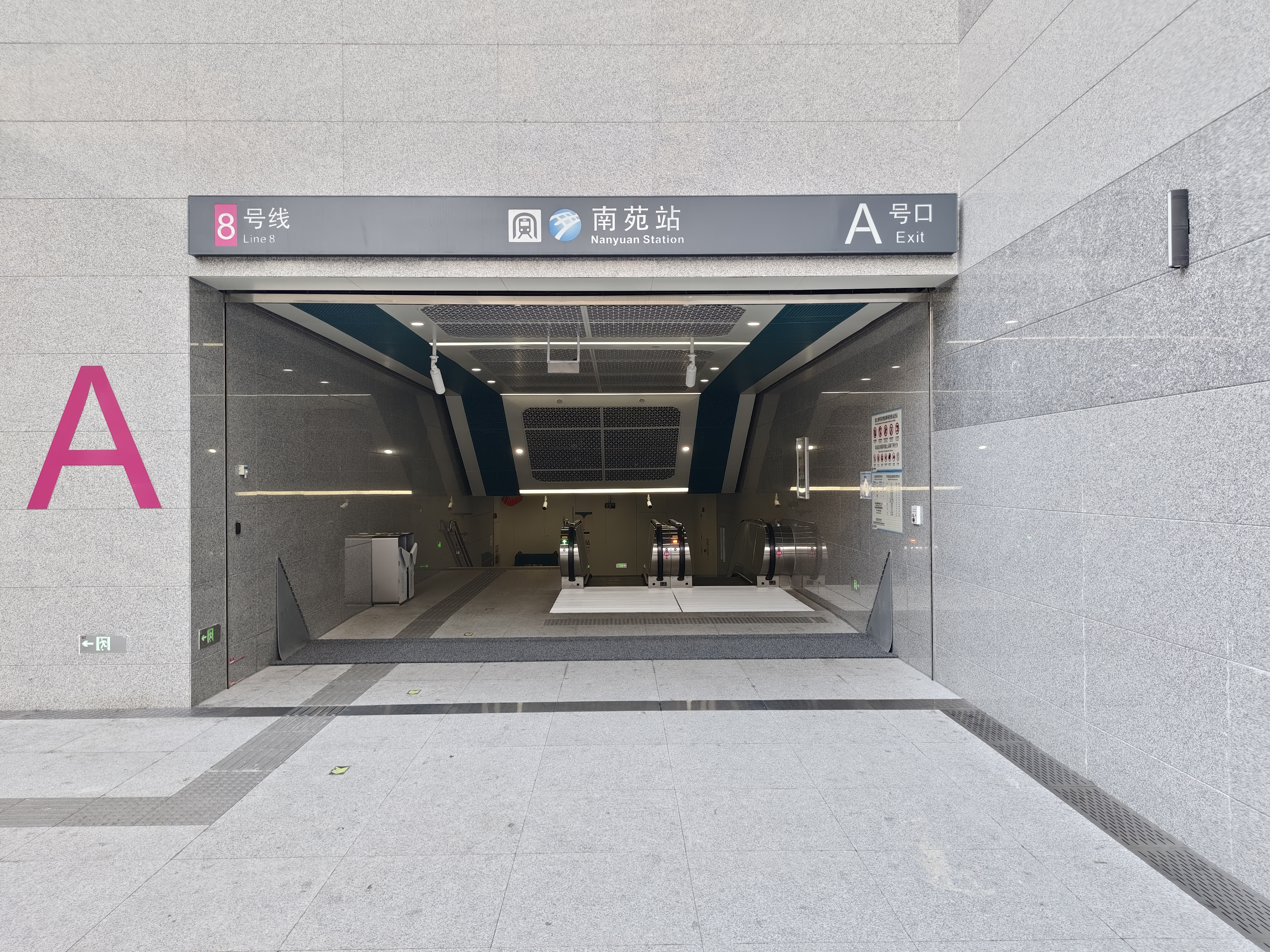
Exit A

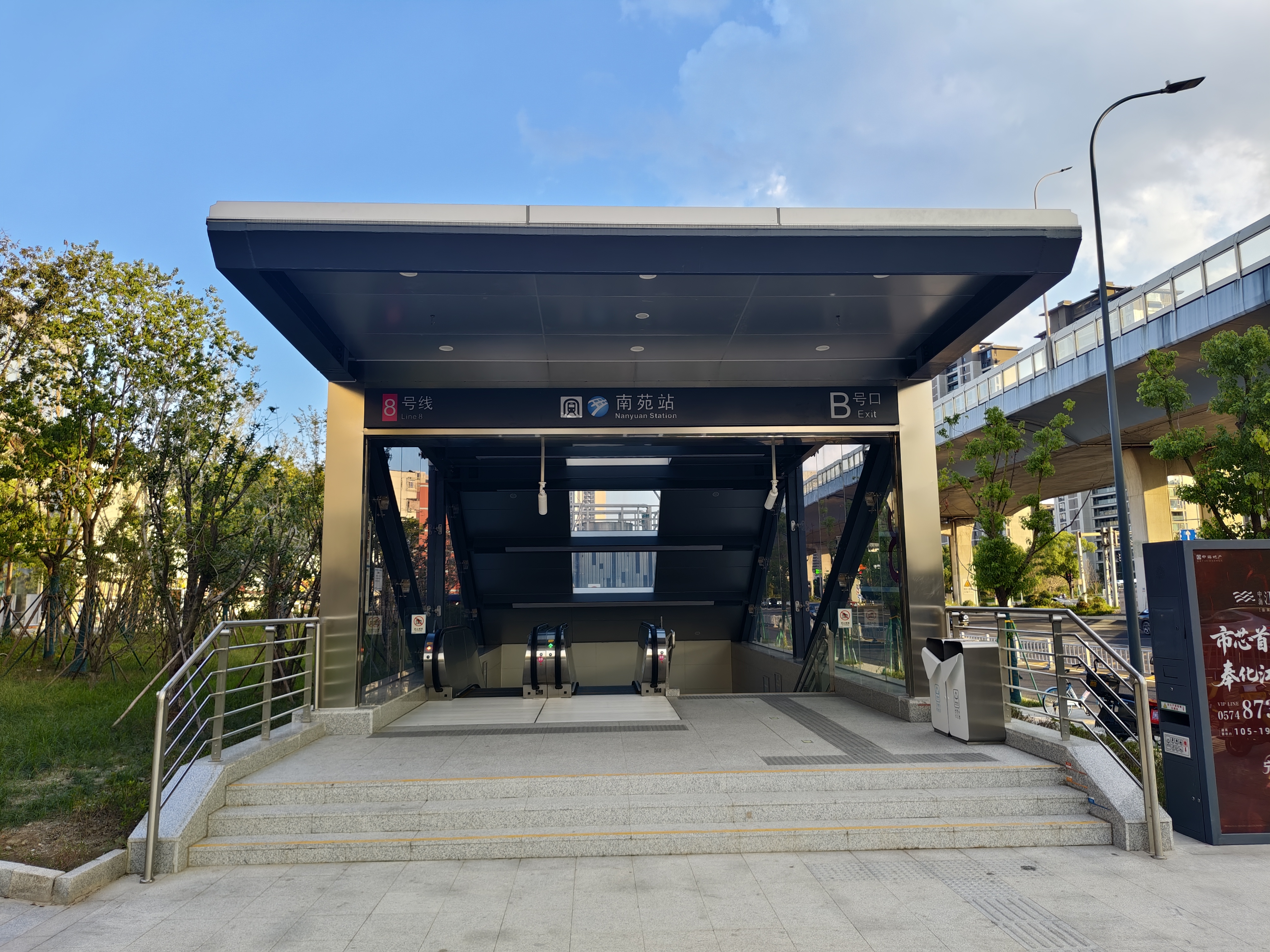
Exit B

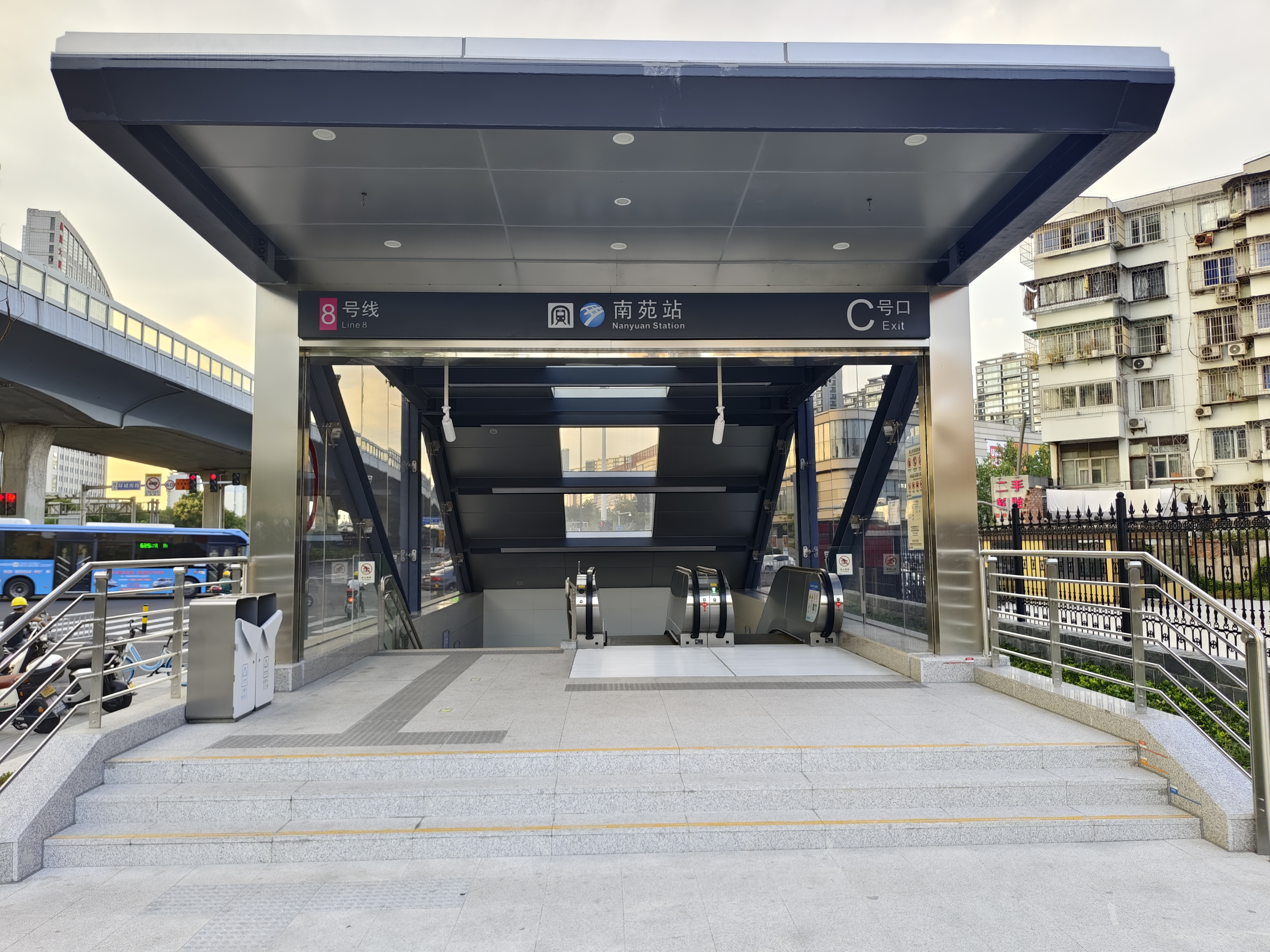
Exit C
