= Line 8 (Ningbo Rail Transit) =

Metro line in Ningbo, Zhejiang

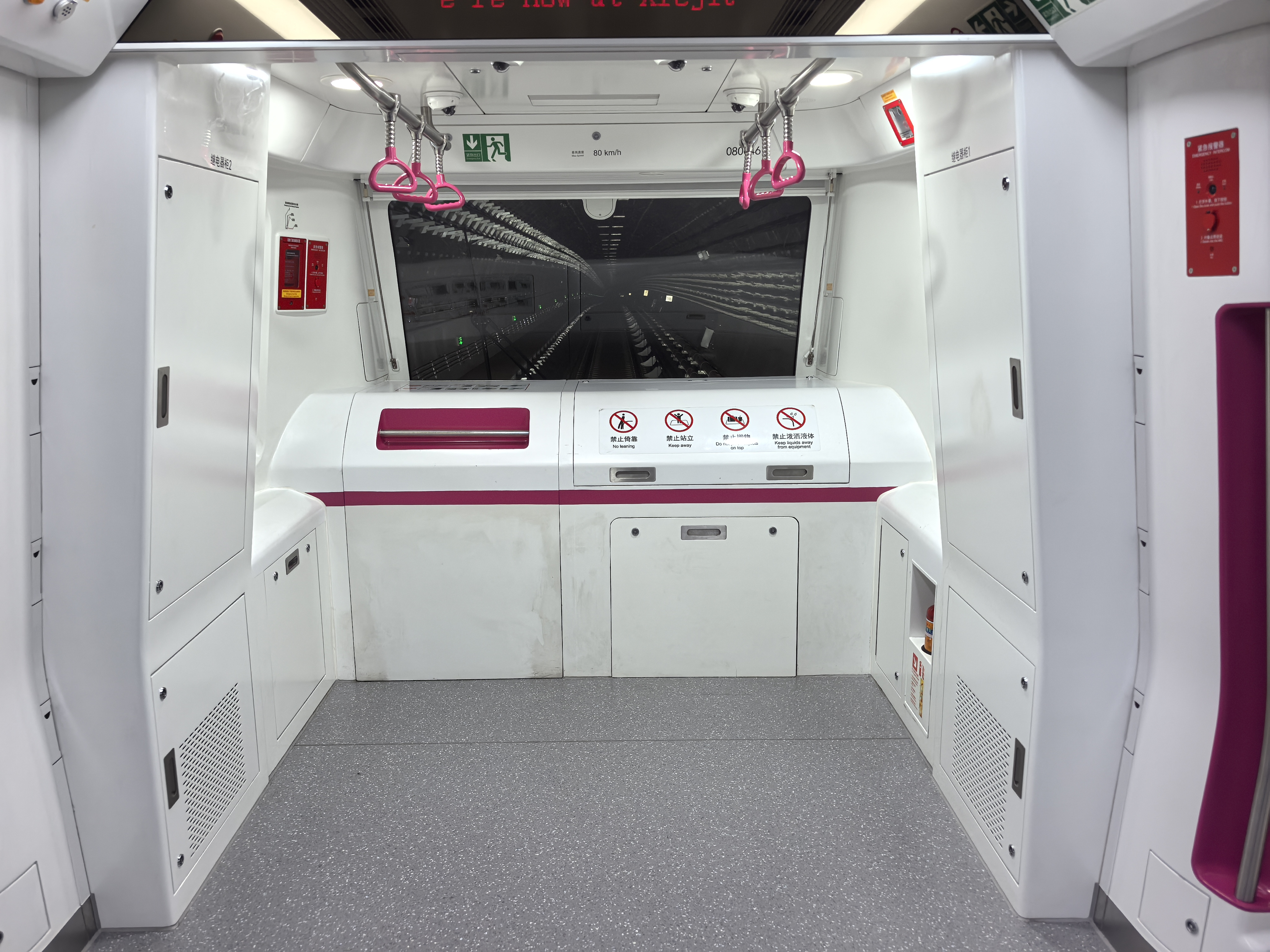
- Driver's cabin of Line 8 train

Overview
- Status: Operational
- Owner: Ningbo Rail Transit Group Co., Ltd
- Locale: Ningbo, Zhejiang, China
- Termini: Hansong Road; Kaiyuan Road
- Stations: 19 (18 in operation)

Service
- Type: Rapid transit
- System: Ningbo Rail Transit
- Operator: Ningbo Rail Transit Group Co., Ltd
- Depot(s): Xiayingnan depot, Hongtang Parking Lot
- Rolling stock: 23 CRRC Zhuzhou six-car type B trains adopt GoA4 automation level

History
- Opened: 30 June 2025; 15 months ago

Technical
- Line length: 21.8 km (13.5 mi) (in operation); 23.3 km (14.5 mi) (Phase 1 total)
- Number of tracks: 2
- Track gauge: 1,435 mm (4 ft 8 1/2 in)
- Electrification: 1,500 V DC Overhead catenary
- Operating speed: 80 km/h (50 mph) (Maximum design speed)
Route map

The Line 8 of Ningbo Rail Transit (Chinese: 宁波轨道交通8号线) is a rapid transit line served Ningbo, Zhejiang, China.

Line 8 is built in accordance with the "Ningbo Urban Rail Transit Phase III Construction Plan (2021-2026)", along with Phase I of Line 6, Line 7; the western extension of Line 1, and the extension of Line 4. Total project investment is 19.9 billion RMB. On 5 January 2022, the first phase of Line 8 began construction. On 16 January 2025, Phase I of Line 8 begin trial operation. On 30 June 2025 at 10:00 am, the first phase of Line 8 from Kaiyuan Road to Hansong Road was officially put into operation. The first phase of Line 8 has a total length of 23.3 kilometers, and the entire line is fully underground, with a total of 19 stations.

Line 8 is designed by Guangzhou Metro Design and Research Institute Co., Ltd. and Zhejiang Huazhan Research and Design Institute Co., Ltd.

== Opening timeline ==
Segment	Commencement	Length	Station(s)	Name
Hansong Road — Kaiyuan Road	30 June 2025	21.8 km (13.55 mi)	18	Phase 1
Hansong Road — Xiaying South	Under construction	1.24 km (0.8 mi)	1	Phase 1

== Stations ==
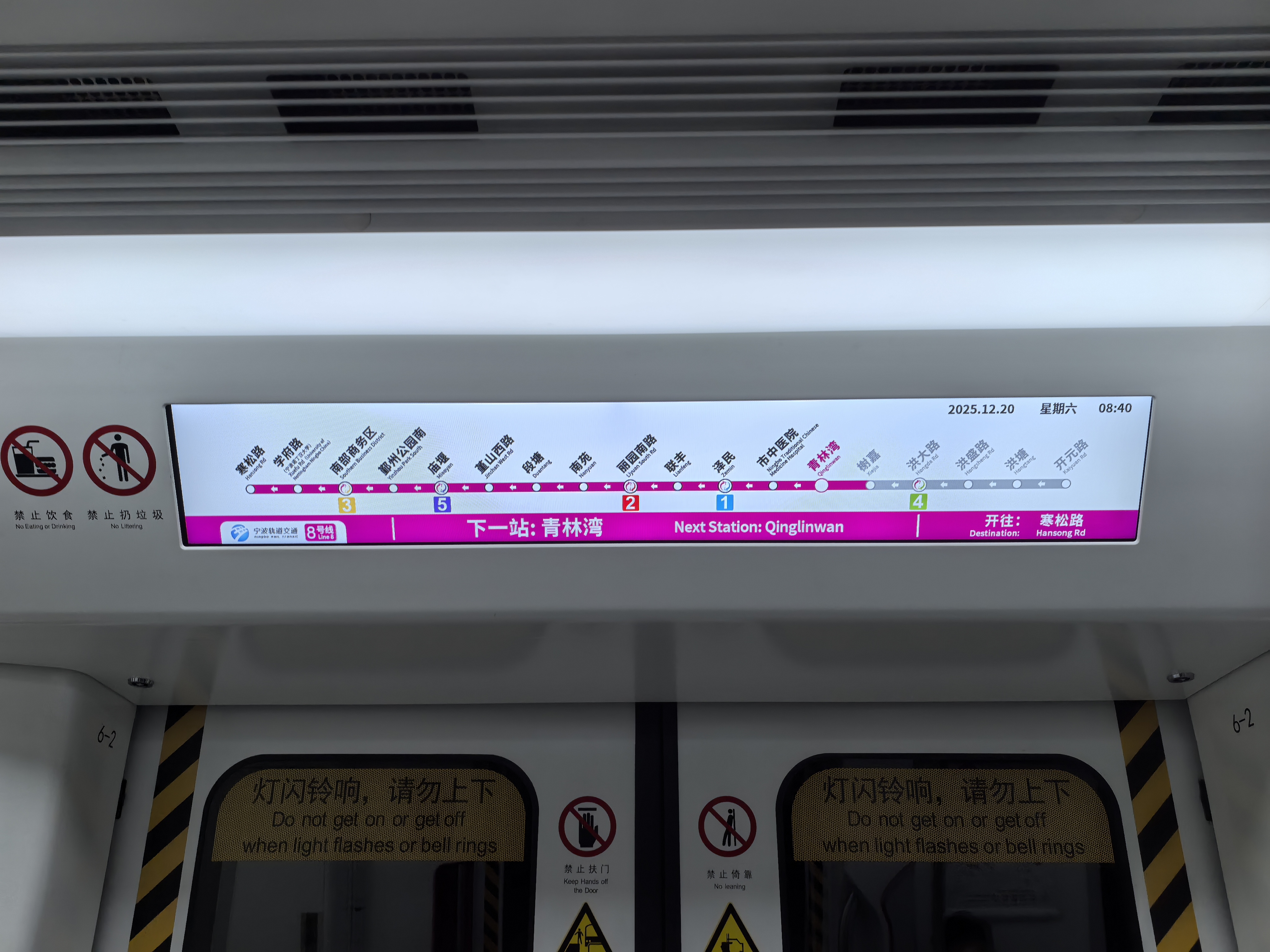
Interior display screen of Line 8 train

All 18 stations are underground. The entire journey will take approximately 38 minutes. In the early days of opening, the interval is 6 minutes during peak periods, 8 minutes during peak periods, and 10 minutes during low peak periods.

Station name		Transfer	Distance km		Location
English	Chinese	Transfer	Distance km		Location
Kaiyuan Road	开元路		0.00	0.00	Jiangbei
Hongtang	洪塘				Jiangbei
Hongsheng Road	洪盛路				Jiangbei
Hongda Road	洪大路	4			Jiangbei
Xiejia	榭嘉				Jiangbei
Qinglinwan	青林湾				Haishu
Ningbo Traditional Chinese Medicine Hospital	市中医院	6			Haishu
Zemin	泽民	1			Haishu
Lianfeng	联丰				Haishu
Liyuan South Road	丽园南路	2			Haishu
Nanyuan	南苑				Haishu
Duantang	段塘				Haishu
Jinshan West Road	堇山西路				Yinzhou
Miaoyan	庙堰	5			Yinzhou
Yinzhou Park South	鄞州公园南				Yinzhou
Southern Business District	南部商务区	3			Yinzhou
Xuefu Road	学府路				Yinzhou
Hansong Road	寒松路				Yinzhou
Xiaying South	下应南				Yinzhou

== Commemorative products ==
To celebrate Line 8 opening on 30 June 2025, Ningbo Rail Transit sold sets of 2 commemorative ticket. Like Line 6 commemorative tickets, each ticket only 15 rides total. There are 2 versions of commemorative ticket: A set without box: 139 RMB (Limited 2000 sets) and A set with hard cover box included Line 8 mini train building blocks: 199 RMB (Limited 200 sets). In parallel with sold commemorative ticket sets, Ningbo Rail Transit also sold: Mini train and Little train building block set; other commemorative products related to Line 8 theme.
