= Line 5 (Ningbo Rail Transit) =

Metro line in Ningbo, China

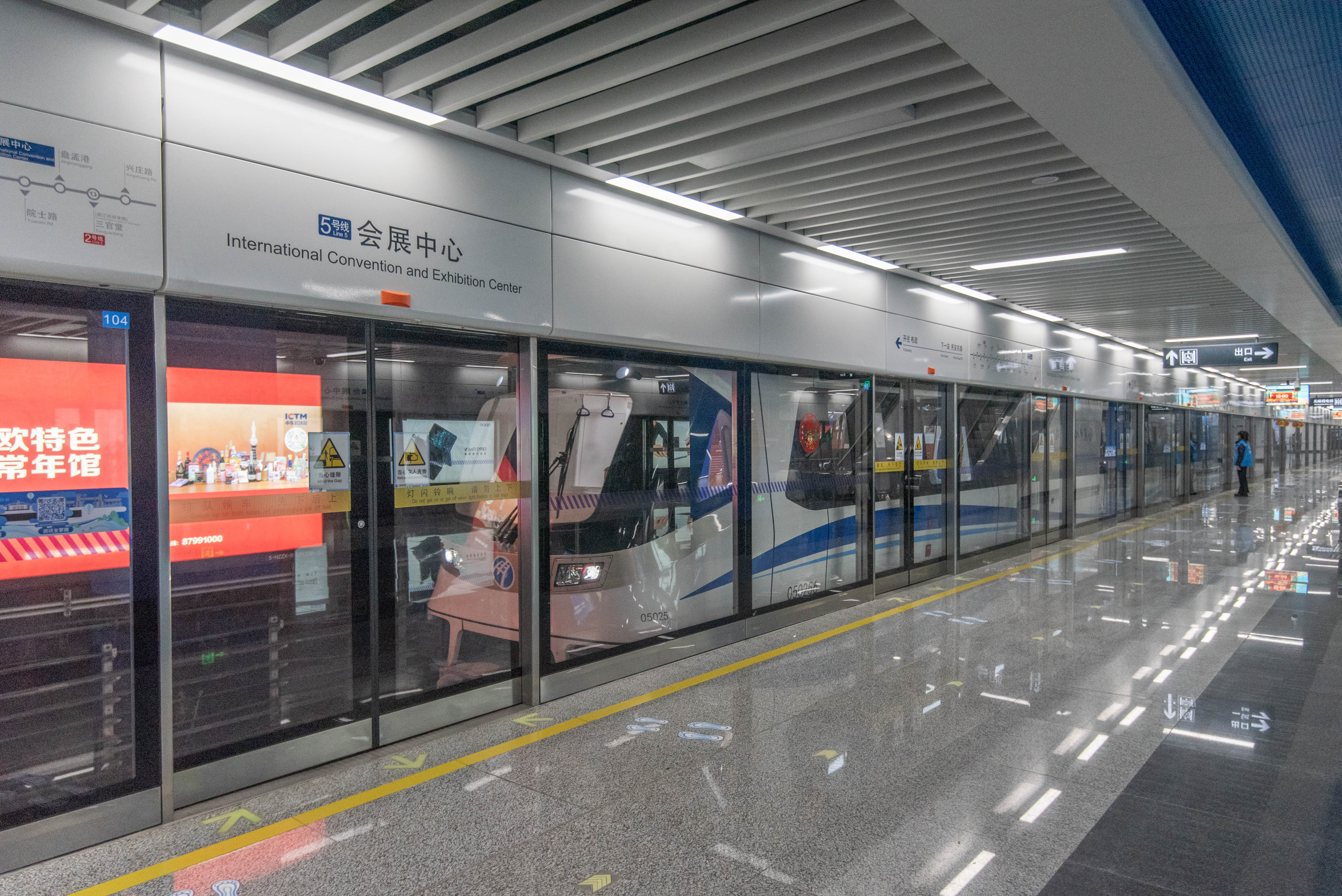
- Train entering the platform of International Convention and Exhibition Center station

Overview
- Status: Operational
- Owner: Ningbo
- Locale: Ningbo, Zhejiang, China
- Termini: Buzheng; Luotuo Bridge
- Stations: 27

Service
- Type: Rapid transit
- System: Ningbo Rail Transit
- Operator(s): Ningbo Rail Transit Co., Ltd.

History
- Opened: 28 December 2021; 4 years ago

Technical
- Line length: 36.6 km (22.74 mi)
- Number of tracks: 2
- Character: Underground
- Track gauge: 1,435 mm (4 ft 8 1/2 in)
Route map

Line 5 of Ningbo Rail Transit (Chinese: 宁波轨道交通5号线) is a rapid transit line in Ningbo. It starts from west Yinzhou District and ends in Luotuo Bridge Station in Zhenhai District. In the future extension plan, the line will extend and become a loop.

The construction of the first section started on 28 September 2016. The line uses GoA4 fully automated trains. It is 27.9 km (17.3 mi) in length with 22 stations. The line opened on 28 December 2021.

Phase 2 of line 3 will have 5 more stations north of Datong Bridge, but due to restrictions of an old airport, part of the phase 2 between Datong Bridge and Yongmao Road is stalled for construction. The rest 3 stations of phase 2 has started construction since 2 December 2019, and will temporary run as a part of line 5. Test run of phase 2 of line 3 started in 1 February 2024.

== Route ==
Phase 1 of Line 5 starts from Buzheng Station in western Yinzhou District as an underground line. Then it goes along Yinxian Road and passes the Fenghua River until it reaches Xiaying and turns north. Then the line goes along first Haiyan Road and then Yuanshi Road. Then the line passes the Yong River and reaches its destination, Xingzhuang Road Station.

== Opening timeline ==
Segment	Commencement	Length	Station(s)	Name
Buzheng — Xingzhuang Road	28 December 2021	27.6 km (17.15 mi)	22	Phase 1
Xingzhuang Road — Meiyan	28 June 2024		2	Part constructed together with Phase 2 of Line 3
Meiyan — Luotuo Bridge	28 June 2024		3	Phase 2 of Line 3, now temporarily run as a part of Line 5

== Stations ==
Station name		Connections	Location
English	Chinese	Connections	Location
Buzheng	布政		Haishu
Zhangjiatan	张家潭		Haishu
Tongde Road	同德路		Haishu
Shiqi	石碶	2	Haishu
Yadu	雅渡		Haishu
Miaoyan	庙堰	8	Yinzhou
Zhonggongmiao	钟公庙		Yinzhou
Yinzhou Government	鄞州区政府	3	Yinzhou
Qianhu South Road	钱湖南路		Yinzhou
South Higher Education Park	南高教园区	4	Yinzhou
Xiaying Road	下应路		Yinzhou
Dayangjiang	大洋江		Yinzhou
Sigang	泗港		Yinzhou
Caoga	曹隘		Yinzhou
Liuga	柳隘		Yinzhou
Haiyan North Road	海晏北路	1	Yinzhou
Min'an East Road	民安东路	7	Yinzhou
International Convention and Exhibition Center	会展中心		Yinzhou
Yuanshi Road	院士路	6	Yinzhou
Angmenggang	盎孟港		Yinzhou
Sanguantang	三官堂	2	Jiangbei
Xingzhuang Road	兴庄路		Zhenhai
Xinghai South Road	兴海南路		Zhenhai
Meiyan	梅堰	10	Jiangbei
↓ Phase 2 of Line 3, now temporarily run as a part of Line 5
Yongmao Road	永茂路	10	Zhenhai
Zhenhai Avenue (Cihai)	镇海大道（慈海）	7	Zhenhai
Luotuo Bridge	骆驼桥		Zhenhai
