= AŽD Praha =

Czech private commercial company

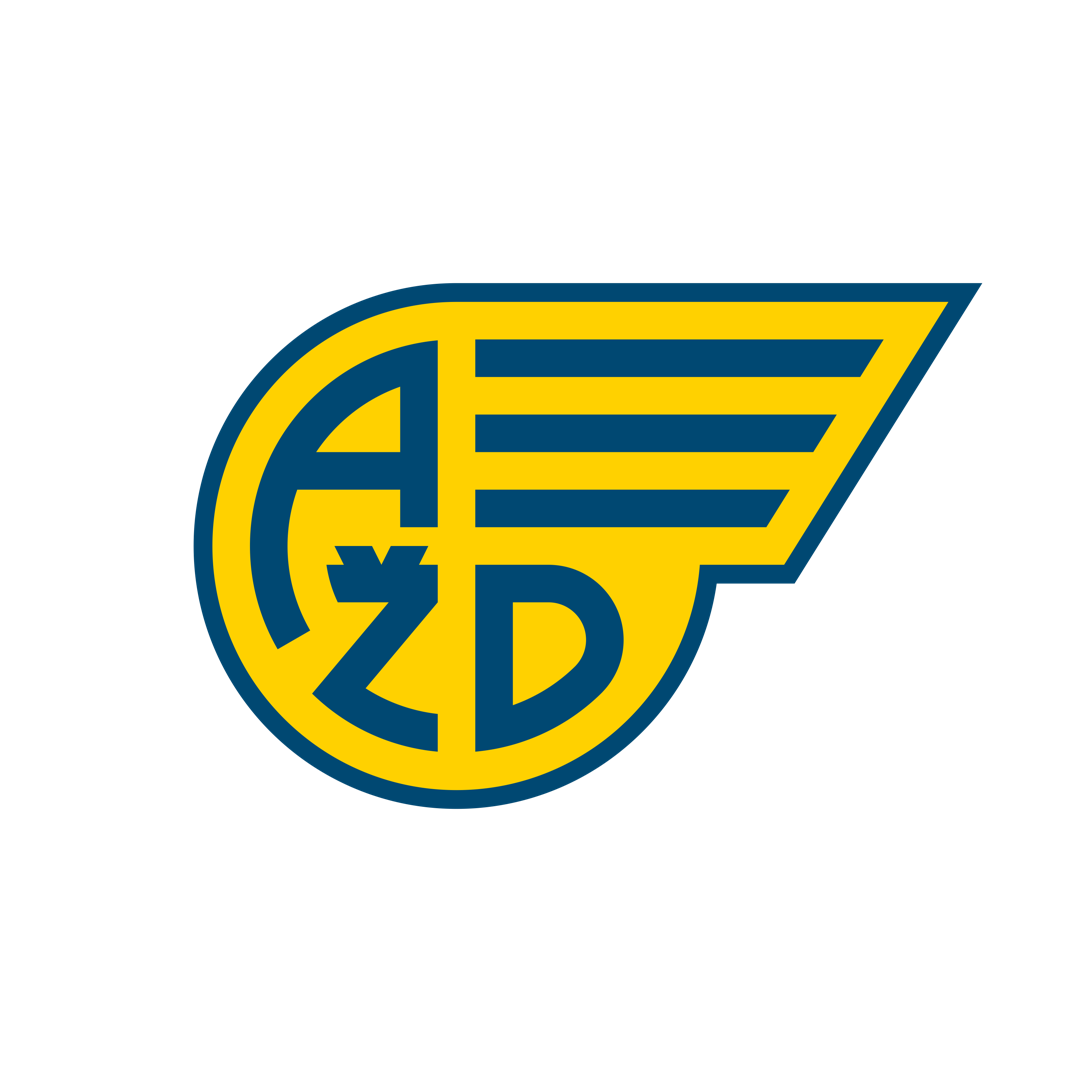
- Industry: Rail transport
- Founded: 1992; 34 years ago
- Headquarters: Žirovnická 3146/2, Prague, 106 00, Czech Republic
- Key people: Zdeněk Chrdle, CEO
- Products: signalling
- Revenue: ▲12 billion Kč (2022)
- Operating income: 2,094,907,000 Czech koruna (2023)
- Net income: 1,884,420,000 Czech koruna (2023)
- Number of employees: 2,311 (2023)
- Website: azd.cz

AŽD Praha s.r.o. is a Czech private commercial company engaged mainly in the development and production of communication, signalling and signalling equipment for railway transport, light signalling equipment for road transport and other additional and related activities. From October 2021 to the end of September 2022, AŽD Praha increased its turnover by 26 percent year-on-year to approximately CZK 12 billion. The company's profit also rose by about CZK 17 million to CZK 975 million.

== Automated train trials ==
In 2021, AŽD demonstrated first automated train operation in the Czech Republic on the Čížkovice–Most line.

In April 2025, AŽD began carrying passengers on selected dates with its driverless railcar EDITA on the Kopidlno–Dolní Bousov line. It was developed by converting a ČD Class 810 railcar. The driver is still on the board and can intervene if needed.

== Gallery ==
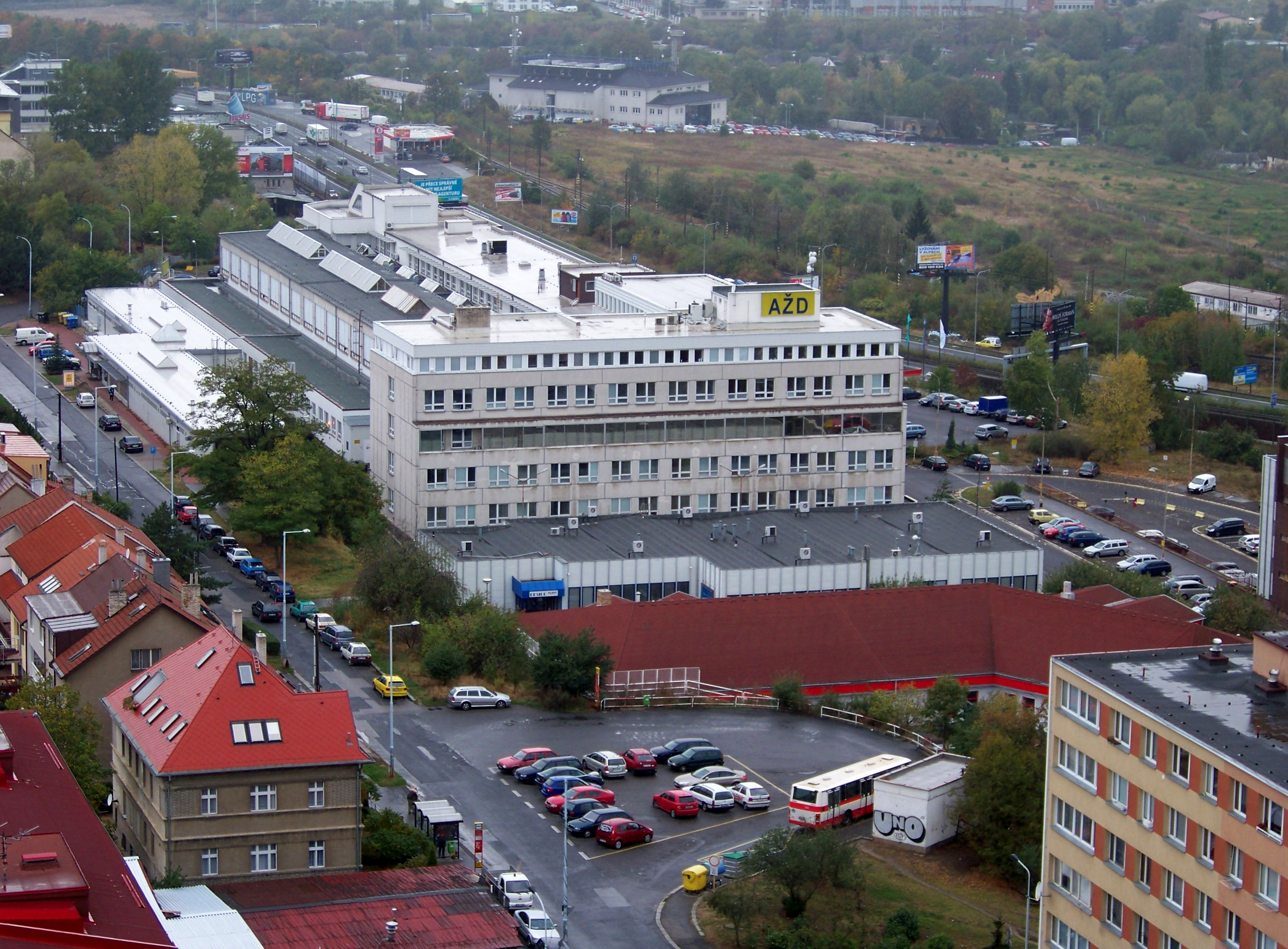
AŽD Praha and the Jesenická roundabout
