= Line 12 (Ningbo Rail Transit) =

Suburban metro line in Zhejiang, China

Overview
- Other names: Ningxiang Line; Ningxiang Intercity railway; Ningbo-Xiangshan Intercity railway; Xiangshan Line; Xiangshan Intercity railway
- Status: In operation
- Owner: Ningbo Rail Transit
- Locale: Ningbo, Zhejiang, China
- Termini: Xiaoyangjiang; Damuwan
- Stations: 10

Service
- Type: Rapid transit, Suburban railway
- System: Ningbo Rail Transit
- Operator: Ningbo Rail Transit
- Depot: Yunlong depot

History
- Opened: 22 September 2026; 22 days ago

Technical
- Line length: 61.45 km (38.18 mi)
- Number of tracks: 2
- Track gauge: 1,435 mm (4 ft 8 1/2 in)
- Electrification: 25 kV AC Overhead catenary contact
- Operating speed: 160 km/h (99 mph) (Maximum design speed)

Line 12 of Ningbo Rail Transit (Chinese: 宁波轨道交通12号线) is a suburban metro line in Ningbo, Zhejiang, China. This line was opened at 10:30 am on 22 September 2026 instead of in the first half of 2027 as originally planned.

== Overview ==
The total investment is approximately 26.8 billion RMB, with an average cost of about 436 million RMB per one kilometer. Among the length of 61.45 km (38.18 mi) on the line, about 30.21 km (18.77 mi) run on elevated section (section over the 8.246 km (5.124 mi) connects Yinzhou to Xiangshan via Xiangshan Port Cross-Sea Bridge with the cross-sea section is 6.24 km (3.88 mi) is included), about 0.91 km (0.57 mi) run on embankment section and about 29.19 km (18.14 mi) run on fully tunnel section. The line connects Ningbo city center to Xiangshan for only 30 minutes. The main rail construction project is expected to officially start on July 1, 2025, and is scheduled for completion on November 30, 2026. Line 12 will be the first suburban/intercity subway line and also the second subway line in Mainland China (The first is Line 1 of Xiamen Metro) to have sea crossing bridge section.

As of June 2025, Line 12 construction has entered a phase of full acceleration: The main structures of all 10 stations have been completed, 17 mountain tunnels have been completed, about 82% of viaduct segments have been completed, and all the tunnel sections are connected.

== History ==
On the morning of 14 January 2022, the first phase of the Line 12 project commenced construction.

On 8 March 2023, the Xiangshan section of the Xiangshan Port Cross-Sea Bridge began construction.

On 6 April 2023, the remaining Yinzhou section of the Xiangshan Port Cross-Sea Bridge began construction.

On 16 June 2025, the north and south main towers of the Xiangshan Port Cross-Sea Bridge were successfully capped, laying the foundation for subsequent construction.

On the morning of 20 March 2026, 2 brand new rolling stock types included Line 12 and Line 10 (Cixi Line) jointly developed by Ningbo Rail Transit and CRRC ZELC (referred as CRRC Zhuzhou Locomotive), was officially debuted at CRRC Ningbo Industrial Base.

On 24 March 2026, Ningbo Rail Transit began receiving their first rolling stock set of Line 12. The remaining 17 trains will arrive in another time.

From 14 September to 19 September 2026, Line 12 will open trial ride activity for the public.

Line 12 was opened at 10:30 on 22 September 2026.

== Timetable ==
The intervals with train run on schedule within 15 minutes from 6:30 to 8:15, 17:00 to 19:00 from Monday to Thursday; 6:30 to 8:15 and 17:30 to 19:00 on Fridays; 8:00 to 19:00 on Saturdays and Sundays. The peak hours are from 15:30 to 17:30 on Fridays within 7 minutes and 30 seconds intervals. Otherwise, the intervals within 20 minutes.

The departure time for express train departing from both terminals are: 7:00, 7:30, 8:00, 17:30, 18:00, 18:30.

== Stations ==
There are 10 stations (2 are underground and 8 are elevated) with an average station distance of 6.83 km (4.24 mi).

Legend:

●	All trains stop.
|	No stop.

Service Pattern		Station name		Transfer	Distance km	Location
Local	Ex	English	Chinese	Transfer	Distance km	Location
●	●	Xiaoyangjiang	小洋江	4 7		Yinzhou
●	|	Yunlong Railway Station	云龙火车			Yinzhou
●	|	Hengxi	横溪			Yinzhou
●	|	Tangxi	塘溪			Yinzhou
●	|	Yinzhou Xianxiang	鄞州咸祥			Yinzhou
●	|	Xiangshan Xianxiang	象山贤庠			Xiangshan County
●	|	Daxu	大徐			Xiangshan County
●	●	Dancheng	丹城			Xiangshan County
●	|	Binhai Avenue	滨海大道			Xiangshan County
●	●	Damuwan	大目湾			Xiangshan County

== Rolling stock ==
As China's first demonstration project for the standardized urban Type A train, the trains have a maximum operation speed of 160 km/h, far exceeding the 80–100 km/h speed of regular subway rolling stock. Configured with 4 cars and a total length of 95.3 meters, the trains are more than 20 meters shorter than the existing 6-car trains.

== Future expansion ==
Under the Ningbo Rail Transit Network Plan (2021-2035) approved by the Ningbo Government, Line 12 is slated for the future construction of the West Station Branch and the Meishan Branch.
