= Line 10 (Ningbo Rail Transit) =

Future metro line in Zhejiang, China

Overview
- Other names: Ningbo-Cixi Intercity railway; Ningci Line; Cixi Line; Cixi Intercity railway
- Status: Under construction
- Owner: Ningbo Rail Transit
- Locale: Ningbo and Cixi, Zhejiang, China
- Termini: Kongpu; Cixi Railway Station
- Stations: 13

Service
- Type: Rapid transit, Intercity rail
- System: Ningbo Rail Transit
- Operator: Ningbo Rail Transit
- Depot: Longshan depot

Technical
- Line length: 64 km (40 mi)
- Number of tracks: 2
- Track gauge: 1,435 mm (4 ft 8 1/2 in)
- Electrification: 25 kV AC 50 Hz Overhead catenary contact
- Operating speed: 160 km/h (99 mph) (Maximum design speed)

Line 10 of Ningbo Rail Transit (Chinese: 宁波轨道交通10号线) is an under construction suburban metro line in Ningbo and Cixi, Zhejiang, China. This line is expected to open at the end of 2026. However, Cixi Railway Station will not open until the end of 2027, while the 12 remaining stations will open at the end of 2026. The line connecting Ningbo city center to Cixi takes only 45 minutes. This will be the Ningbo Rail Transit metro line to reach a maximum speed of up to 160 km/h. A set of 22 trains will be produced to meet the demands on the entire line.

Among the distance of 64 km (38.18 mi) on the line, 34.9 km (21.7 mi) run on elevated sections; 23.5 km (14.6 mi) run on underground sections (included 22.5 km (14.0 mi) of bored tunnel and 1.5 km (0.93 mi) of mountain tunnel), account for 36.7%. The U-shaped section spanning 1.1 km (0.68 mi) long. The whole line consists of 13 stations, 1 depot, 2 traction substations.

== History ==
On 2 November 2022. Line 10 began construction, with total investment approximately 32 billion RMB, with an average cost of about 500 million RMB per one kilometer.

On the morning of 20 March 2026, 2 brand new rolling stock types included Line 12 (Xiangshan Line) and Line 10 jointly developed by Ningbo Rail Transit and CRRC ZELC, was officially debuted at CRRC Ningbo Industrial Base.

On 20 May 2026, Ningbo Rail Transit began receiving its first rolling stock set of Line 10 at Longshan Depot. The remaining 21 trains will arrive in another time.

On 22 June 2026, Line 10 was completed hot running test.

== Stations ==
There are 13 stations (7 are underground and 6 are elevated) with an average station distance of 5.3 km (3.3 mi).

Station name		Transfer	Distance km	Location
English	Chinese	Transfer	Distance km	Location
Cixi Railway Station	慈溪火车站			Cixi
Chaotang	潮塘			Cixi
Xincheng Avenue	新城大道			Cixi
Xiaolin	逍林			Cixi
Guanfu	观附			Cixi
Guanhaiwei	观海卫			Cixi
Zhangqi	掌起			Cixi
Longshan	龙山			Cixi
Jiulong Lake	九龙湖			Zhenhai, Ningbo
Luoxing	骆兴	7		Zhenhai, Ningbo
Yongmao Road	永茂路	5 (Line 3 Phase 2)		Zhenhai, Ningbo
Meiyan	梅堰	5		Jiangbei, Ningbo
Kongpu	孔浦	2		Jiangbei, Ningbo

== Rolling stock ==
As China's first demonstration project for the standardized urban Type A train, the trains have a maximum operation speed of 160 km/h, far exceeding the 80–100 km/h speed of regular subway rolling stock. Configured with 4 cars and a total length of 95.3 meters, the trains are more than 20 meters shorter than the existing 6-car trains.
