= Harry Reid International Airport Automated People Movers =

Three transport rail systems in Las Vegas, Nevada

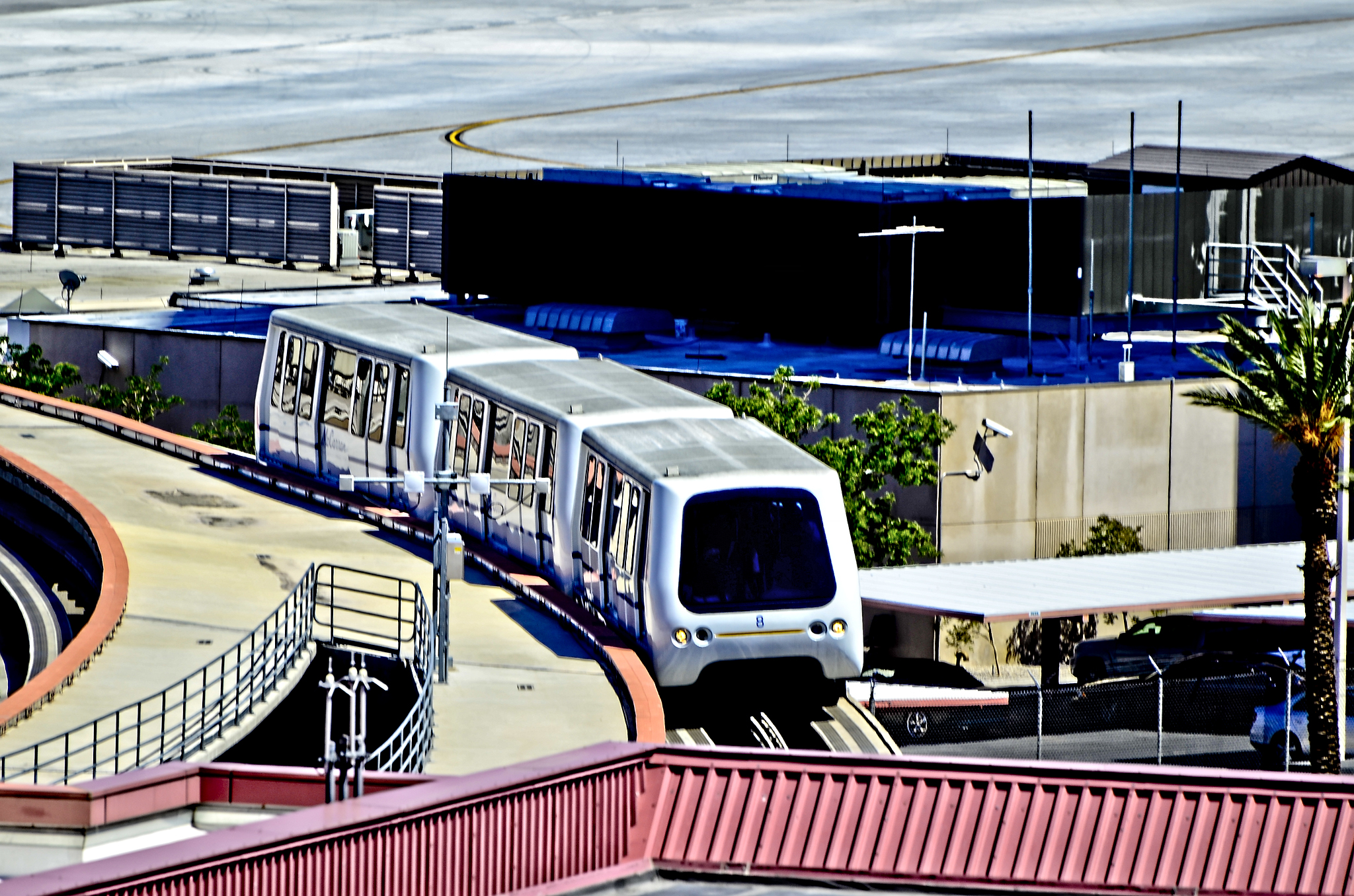
- Automated people mover at Harry Reid

Overview
- Locale: Harry Reid International Airport serving Las Vegas
- Stations: 4

Service
- Type: People mover
- Services: 3
- Operator: Clark County Department of Aviation
- Rolling stock: 16 Bombardier Innovia APM 100 vehicles

History
- Opened: Green Line: 1985; Blue Line: 1998; Red Line: 2012

Technical
- Line length: 1.15 mi (1.85 km)
- Track length: .27 mi (0.43 km) (Green Line).65 mi (1.05 km) (Blue Line).23 mi (0.37 km) (Red Line)
- Character: Serves sterile parts of the airport

The Harry Reid International Airport People Movers are three separate automatic people mover systems operating at Harry Reid International Airport near Las Vegas, Nevada. The people mover system consists of three separate lines: the Green Line connecting the Main Terminal to the C Gate Concourse, the Blue Line connecting the Main Terminal to the D Gate Concourse, and the Red Line connecting the D Gates Concourse to Terminal 3. Each line currently uses CITYFLO650 radio-based moving block signaling technology, which was introduced to the tram system when the Green and Blue Lines vehicles were replaced, the Red Line has always used moving block signaling technology as it opened in 2012 and it is the newest of the three lines.

The lines were branded to their current names in 2016. This was done to lessen passengers' confusion as to which line to take from the D Gates to baggage claim.

== Lines ==
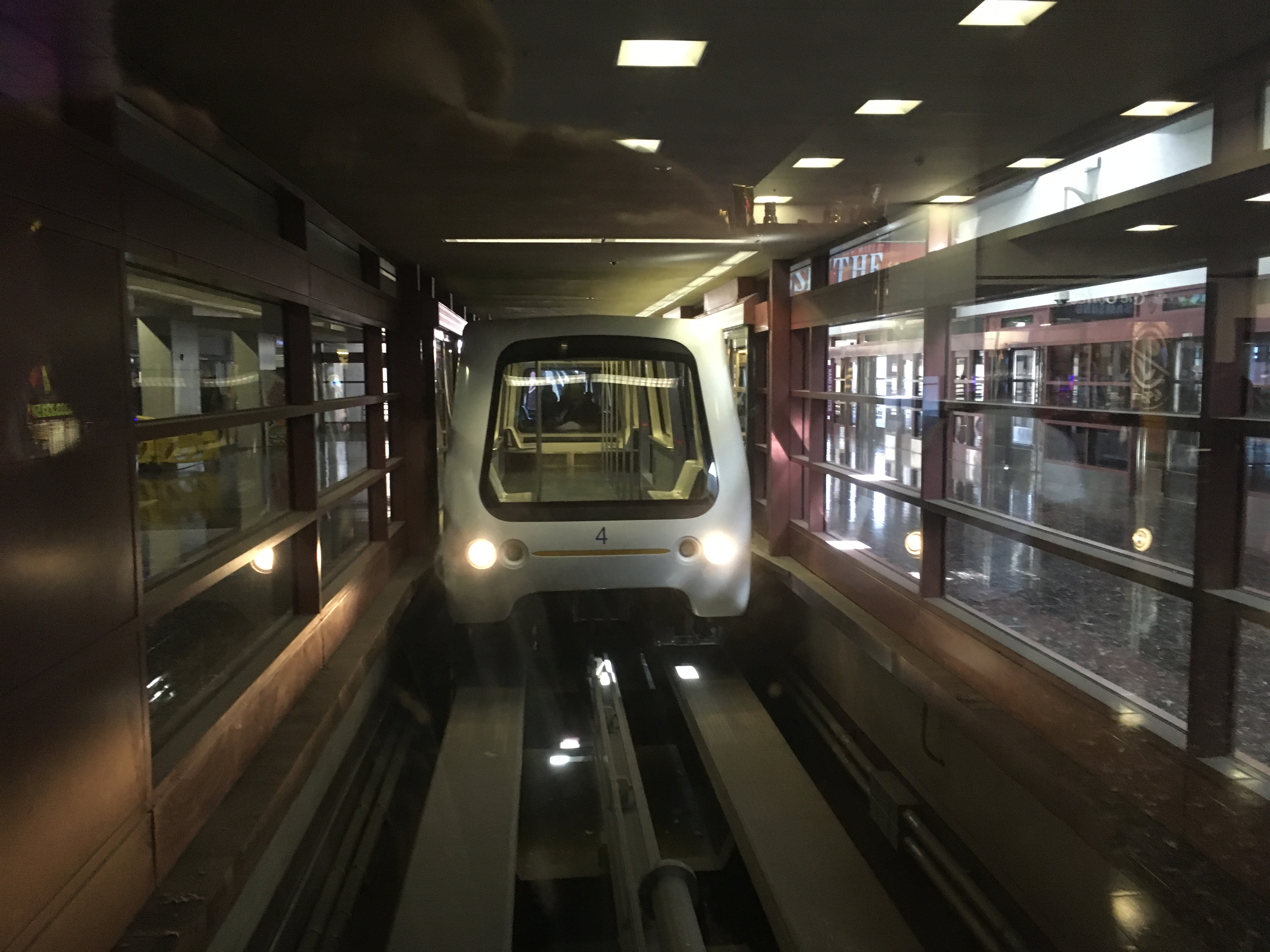
Tram at C Gates

Reid terminal/concourse map

=== Green Line ===
The Green Line was the first people mover line at the airport, opening in 1985. It connects Terminal 1 with the C Gate Concourse, which primarily serves Southwest Airlines. The Green Line features two parallel quarter-mile tracks each with two-car trams running back and forth between the two stations. In 2008, the line's original Westinghouse/Adtranz C-100 vehicles were replaced with the current Bombardier Innovia APM 100 (formerly CX-100) vehicles.

=== Blue Line ===
The Blue Line is the longest of the three lines and it connects the Terminal 1 building with the satellite D Gate Concourse. Similar to the Green Line, the Blue Line consists of two kilometer-long parallel tracks with trams shuttling back and forth between the two stations. The Blue Line opened in 1998 when the D Gates Concourse opened and introduced the CX-100 vehicles. Each tram on the Blue Line includes three cars, each of which has a capacity of 270 people. When the Green Line fleet was replaced, the Blue Line's original AdTranz CX-100 vehicles were also replaced soon after with the current Bombardier Innovia APM 100 vehicles similar to the previous vehicles in early 2009.

=== Red Line ===
Terminal 3 is connected to the D Gates Concourse via the Red Line. Like the two prior lines, the Red Line consists of two tracks, each with a three-car tram shuttling back and forth between the two stations. The third line also uses Bombardier Innovia APM 100 vehicles. Like The Plane Train at the Hartsfield–Jackson Atlanta International Airport and the Automated Guideway Transit System at Denver International Airport, the line is completely underground.

== See also ==
- List of airport people mover systems
