= Line 7 (Ningbo Rail Transit) =

Metro line in Ningbo, Zhejiang

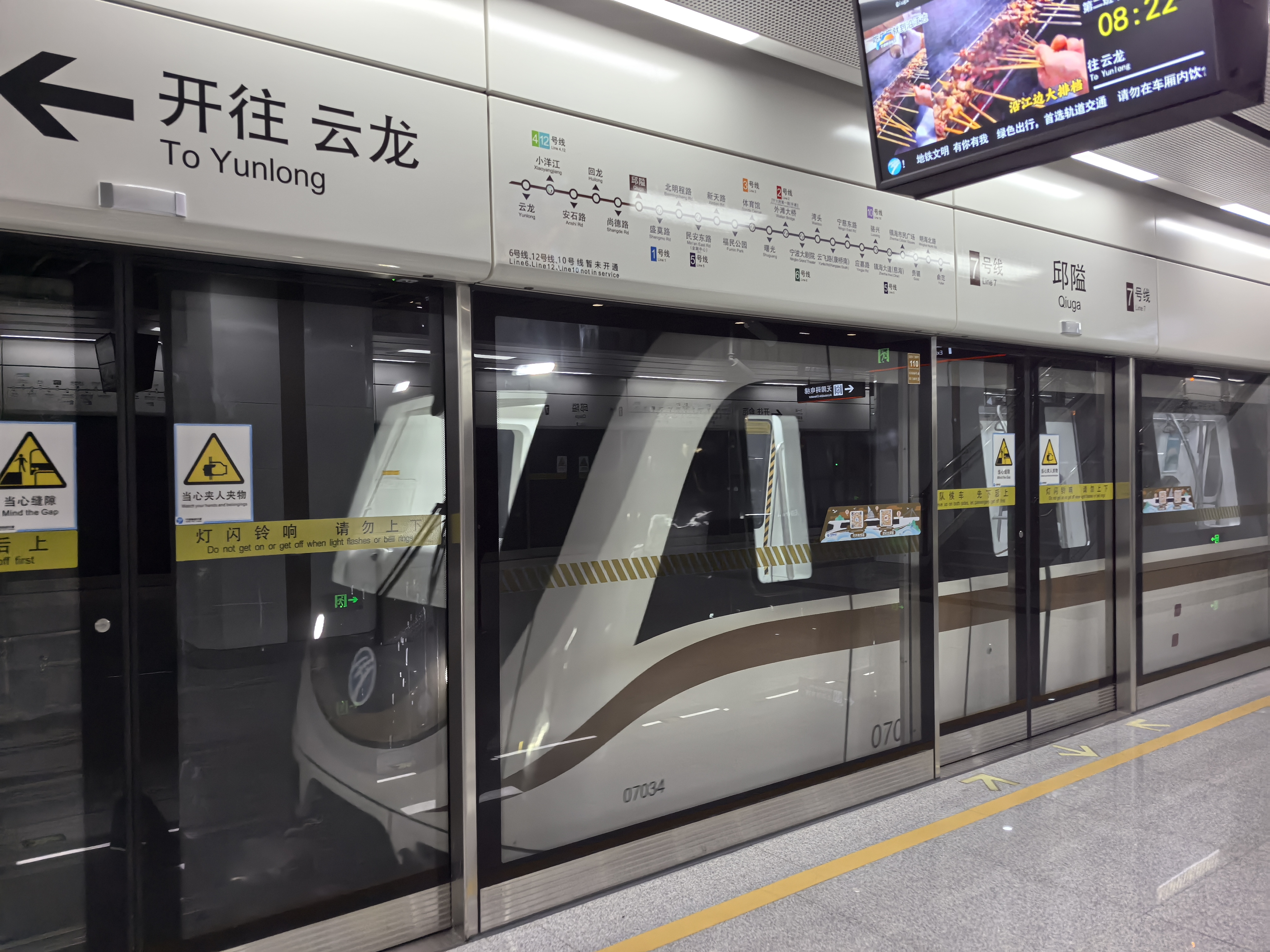
- Line 7 train entering the platform of Qiuga station

Overview
- Status: Operational
- Owner: Ningbo Rail Transit Group Co., Ltd
- Locale: Ningbo, Zhejiang, China
- Termini: Yunlong; Yufan
- Stations: 25

Service
- Type: Rapid transit
- System: Ningbo Rail Transit
- Operator: Ningbo Rail Transit Group Co., Ltd
- Depot(s): Xiayingnan depot, Lianqun Parking lot
- Rolling stock: 6-car type B adopts GoA4 automation level

History
- Opened: 29 August 2025; 13 months ago

Technical
- Line length: 39.4 km (24.5 mi)
- Number of tracks: 2
- Track gauge: 1,435 mm (4 ft 8 1/2 in)
- Electrification: 1,500 V DC Overhead catenary
- Operating speed: 100 km/h (62 mph) (Maximum design speed)
Route map

The Line 7 of Ningbo Rail Transit (Chinese: 宁波轨道交通7号线) is a rapid transit line served Ningbo, Zhejiang, China.

The National Development and Reform Commission (NDRC) approved the Ningbo Urban Rail Transit Phase III Construction Plan (2021–2026) plans to construct five projects in 2020: Phase I of Line 6, Line 7; Phase I of Line 8, the western extension of Line 1, and the extension of Line 4. Construction of the first station on Line 7 began on 15 July 2021 and construction of the entire line began on 5 January 2022 with total project investment is 33.89 billion RMB.

== Stations ==
All 25 stations are underground.

Station name		Transfer	Distance km		Location
English	Chinese	Transfer	Distance km		Location
Yufan	俞范		0.00	0.00	Zhenhai
Minghai North Road	明海北路				Zhenhai
Guisi	贵驷				Zhenhai
Zhenhai Citizen Square	镇海市民广场				Zhenhai
Zhenhai Avenue (Cihai)	镇海大道(慈海)	5			Zhenhai
Luoxing	骆兴	10			Zhenhai
Yingjia Road	应嘉路				Jiangbei
Ningci East Road	宁慈东路				Jiangbei
Yunfei Road (Kangqiao South)	云飞路 (康桥南)				Jiangbei
Wantou	湾头				Jiangbei
Ningbo Grand Theater	宁波大剧院	6			Jiangbei
Waitan Bridge	外滩大桥	2			Jiangbei
Shuguang	曙光				Yinzhou
Sports Center	体育馆	3			Yinzhou
Fumin Park	福民公园				Yinzhou
Xintian Road	新天路				Yinzhou
Min'an East Road	民安东路	5			Yinzhou
Beimingcheng Road	北明程路				Yinzhou
Shengmo Road	盛莫路	1			Yinzhou
Qiuga	邱隘				Yinzhou
Shangde Road	尚德路				Yinzhou
Huilong	回龙				Yinzhou
Anshi Road	安石路				Yinzhou
Xiaojiangyang	小洋江	4 12			Yinzhou
Yunlong	云龙			39.4	Yinzhou

== Related Events ==
From 29 August to 7 September 2025, passengers can receive a free experience ride coupons at any station of Line 7. Each person only received one coupon at a time.
