= People mover =

Automated small-scale transit systems

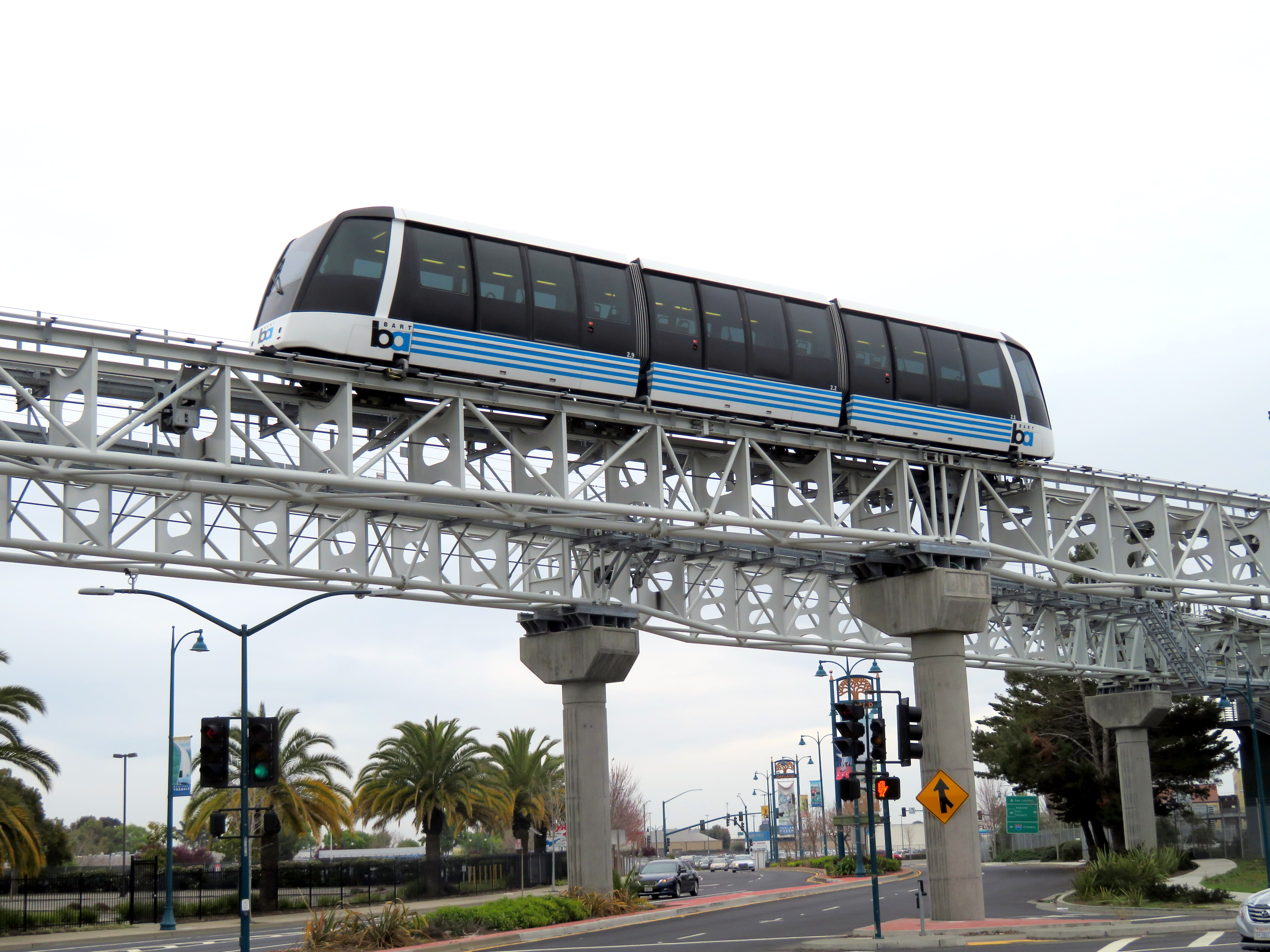
A BART Cable Liner people mover at Oakland International Airport

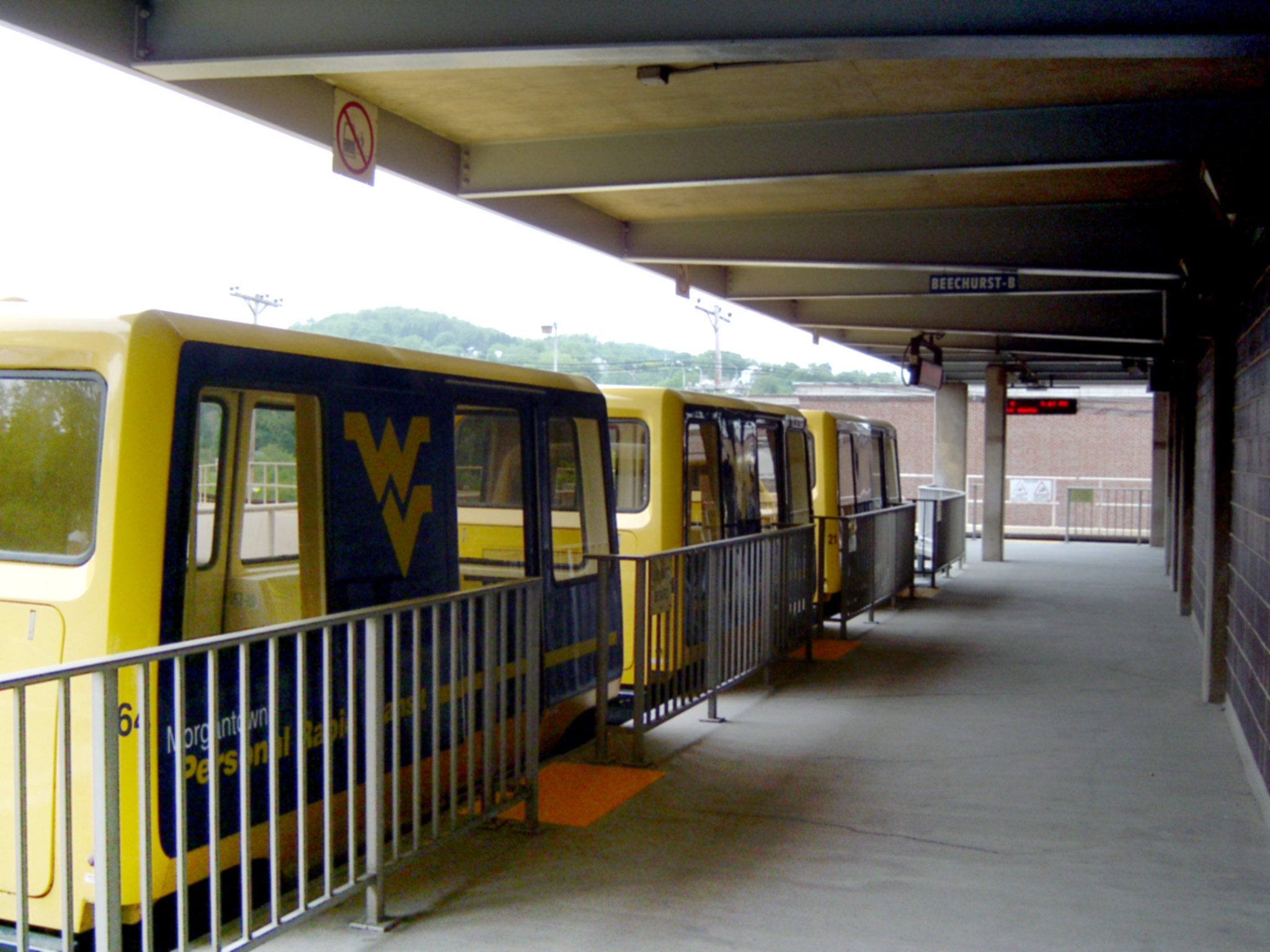
Morgantown Personal Rapid Transit

A people mover or automated people mover (APM) is a type of small-scale automated guideway transit system. The term is generally used only to describe systems serving relatively small areas such as airports, downtown districts or theme parks.

The term was originally applied to three different systems, developed roughly at the same time. One was Skybus, an automated mass transit system prototyped by the Westinghouse Electric Corporation beginning in 1964. The second, alternately called the People Mover and Minirail, opened in Montreal at Expo 67. Finally the last, called PeopleMover or WEDway PeopleMover, was an attraction that was originally presented by Goodyear Tire and Rubber Company and that opened at Disneyland in 1967. The term "people mover" currently describes technologies such as monorail, rail tracks and maglev. Propulsion may involve conventional on-board electric motors, linear motors or cable traction.

Generally speaking, larger APMs are referred to by other names. The most generic is "automated guideway transit", which encompasses any automated system regardless of size. Some complex APMs deploy fleets of small vehicles over a track network with off-line stations, and supply near non-stop service to passengers. These taxi-like systems are more usually referred to as personal rapid transit (PRT). Larger systems, with vehicles with 20 to 40 passengers, are sometimes referred to as "group rapid transit" (GRT), although this term is not particularly common. Other complex APMs have similar characteristics to rapid transit systems, and there is no clear-cut distinction between a complex APM of this type and an automated mass transit system. Another term "light metro" is also applied to describe the system worldwide.

Non-automated, non-guideway mobile lounges at a small number of aerospace facilities are also sometimes called "people movers".

== History ==
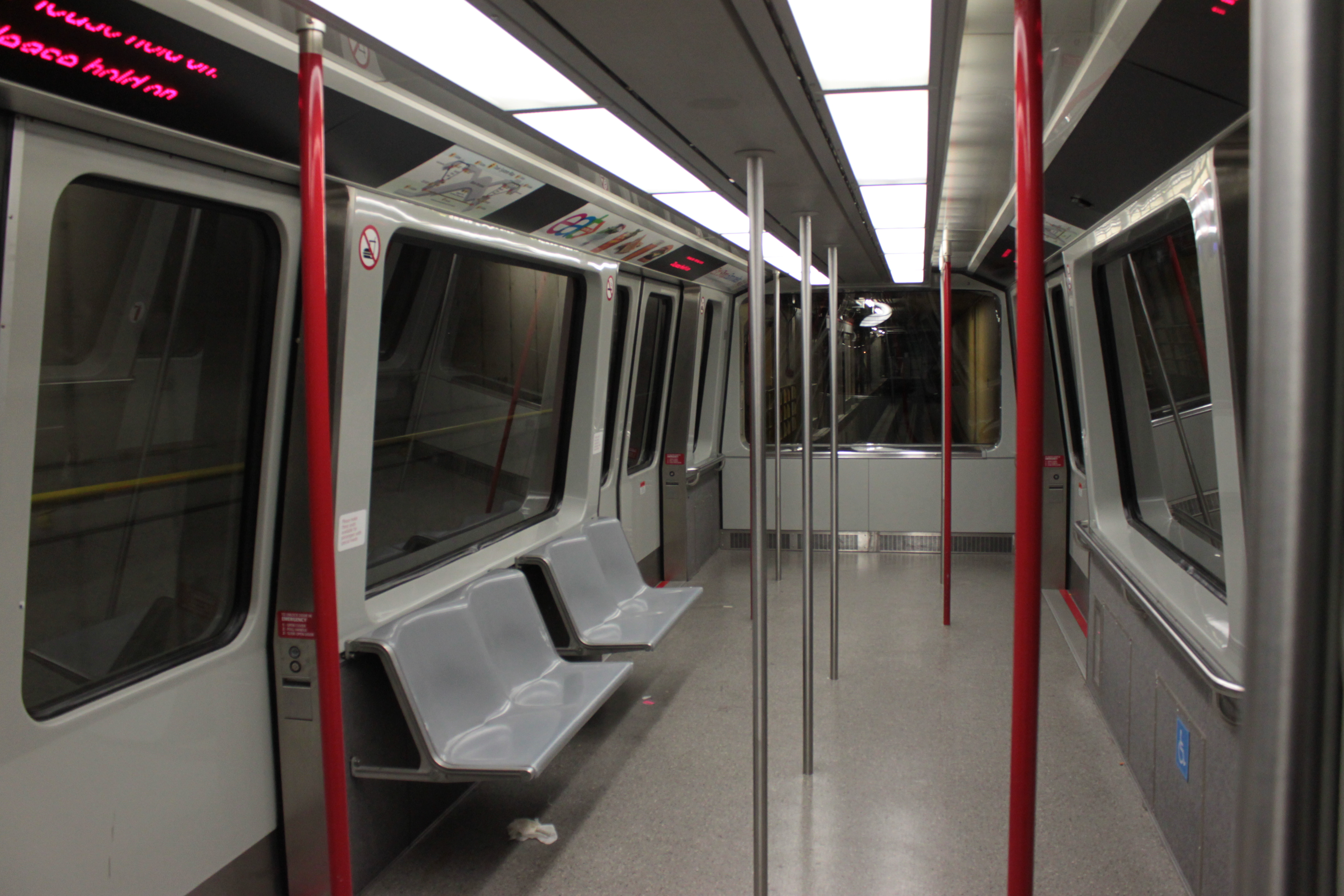
Interior of SEA Underground in Seattle–Tacoma International Airport. Opened in 1969, it was one of the first operational automated people mover systems in the world.

=== Never-Stop Railway ===
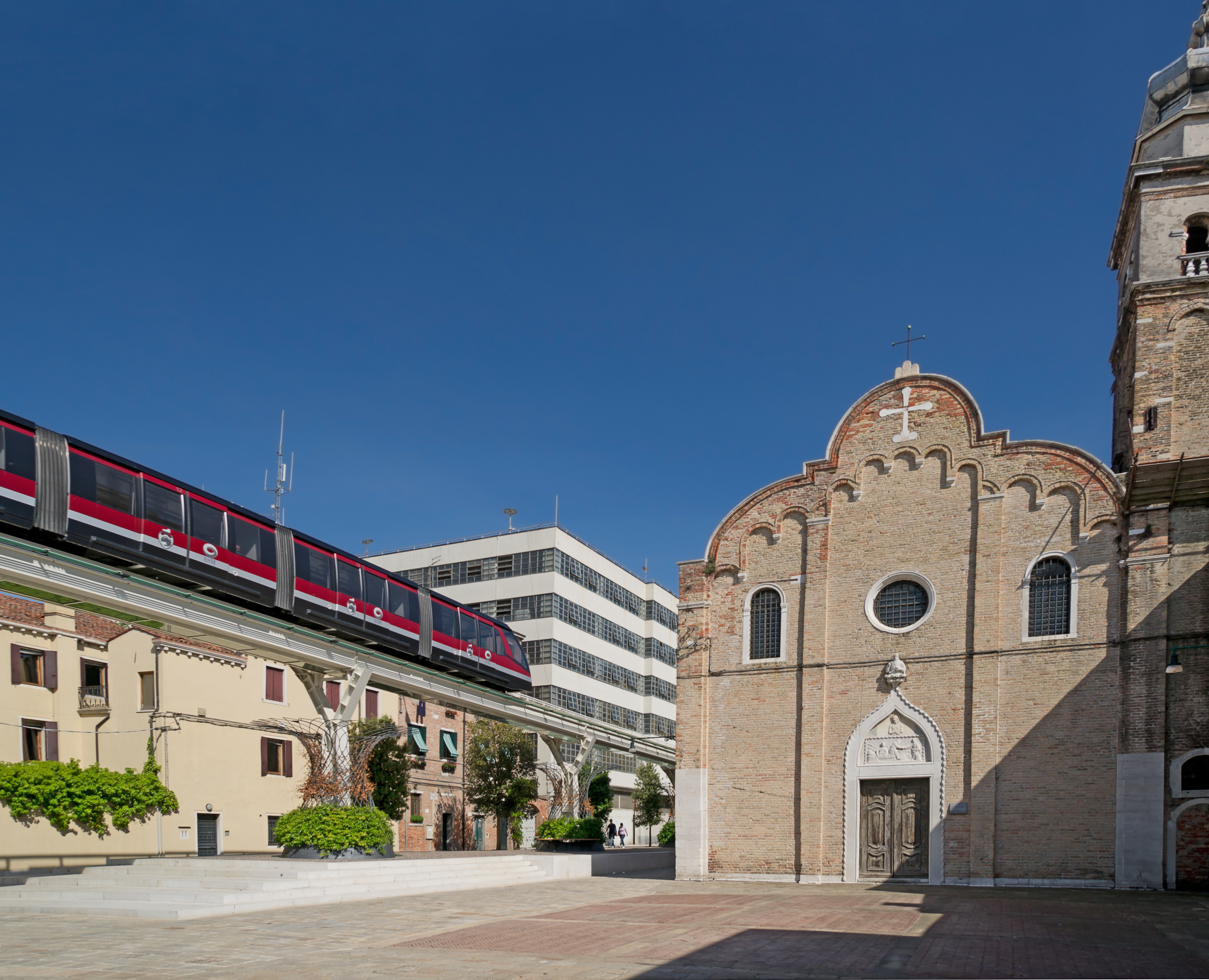
People Mover in Venice, Italy

One of the first automated systems for human transportation was the screw-driven 'Never-Stop-Railway', constructed for the British Empire Exhibition at Wembley, London in 1924. This railway consisted of 88 unmanned carriages, on a continuous double track along the northern and eastern sides of the exhibition, with reversing loops at either end.

The carriages ran on two parallel concrete beams and were guided by pulleys running on the inner side of these concrete beams, and were propelled by gripping a revolving screw thread running between the tracks in a pit; by adjusting the pitch of this thread at different points, the carriages could be sped up, or slowed down to a walking pace at stations, to allow passengers to join and leave. The railway ran reliably for the two years of the exhibition, and was then dismantled.

=== Goodyear and Stephens-Adamson ===
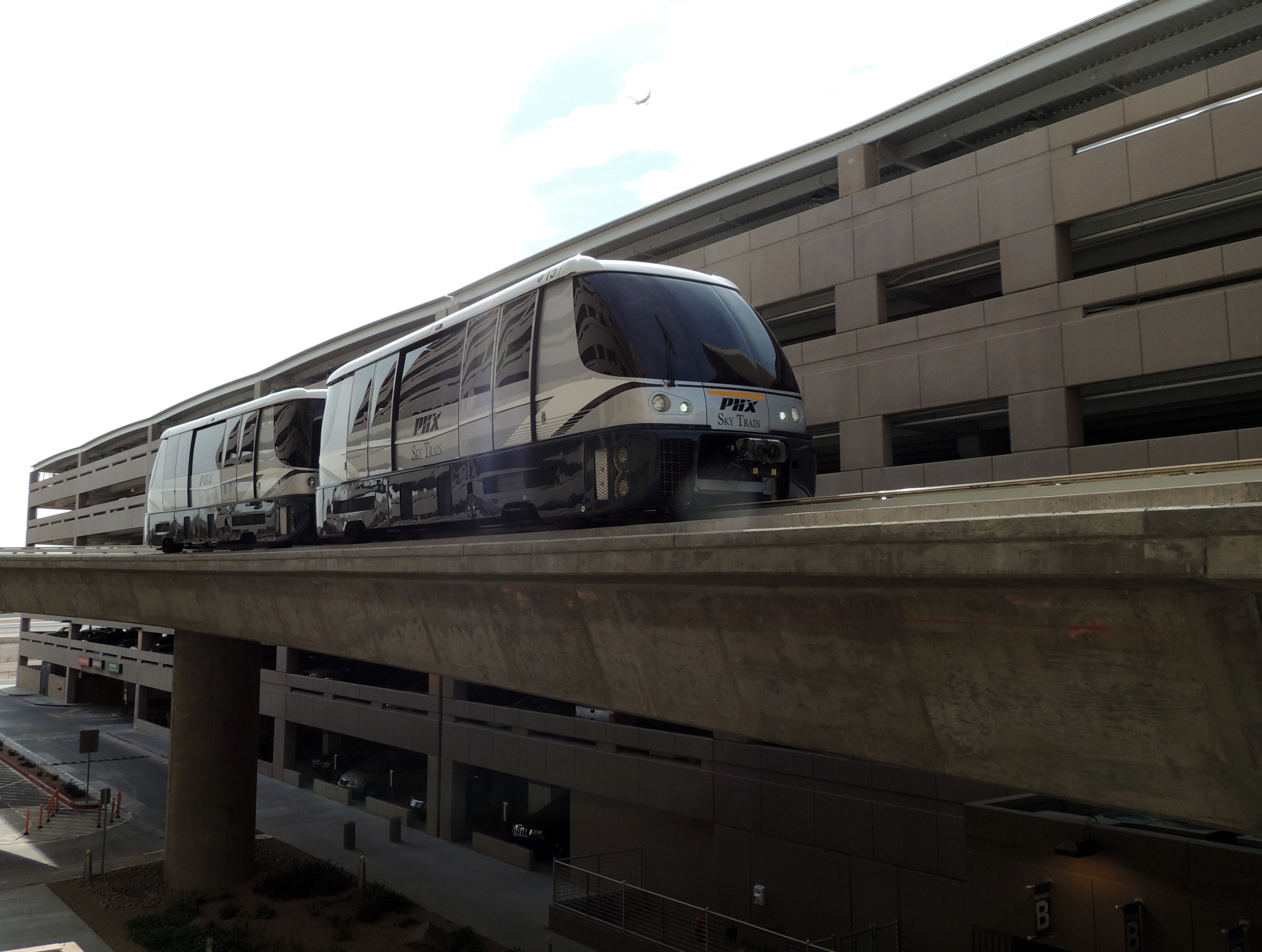
PHX Sky Train in Phoenix, Arizona, United States, opened in 2013

In late 1949, Mike Kendall, chief engineer and Chairman of the Board of Stephens-Adamson Manufacturing Company, an Illinois-based manufacturer of conveyor belts and systems, asked Al Neilson, an engineer in the Industrial Products Division of Goodyear Tire and Rubber Co., if Goodyear had ever considered working on People Movers. He felt that with Goodyear's ability to move materials in large quantities on conveyor belts they should consider moving batches of people.

Four years of engineering design, development and testing led to a joint patent being issued for three types of people movers, named Speedwalk, Speedramp, and Carveyor. Goodyear would sell the concept and Stephens-Adamson would manufacture and install the components.

A Speedwalk consisted of a flat conveyor belt riding on a series of rollers, or a flat slippery surface, moving at 1.5 mph (2.4 km/h) (approximately half the speed of walking). The passengers would walk onto the belt and could stand or walk to the exit point. They were supported by a moving handrail. Customers were expected to include airport terminals, ballparks, train stations, etc. Today, several manufacturers produce similar units called moving walkways.

A Speedramp was very similar to a Speedwalk but it was used to change elevations; up or down a floor level. This could have been accomplished by an escalator, but the Speedramp would allow wheeled luggage, small handcarts etc. to ride the belt at an operating cost predicted to be much lower than escalators or elevators. The first successful installation of a Speedramp was in the spring of 1954 at the Hudson and Manhattan Railroad Station in Jersey City, New Jersey, to connect the Erie Railroad to the Hudson and Manhattan Tubes. This unit was 227 feet (69 m) long with a rise of 22 feet (6.7 m) on a 15 degree grade, and only cost $75,000.

A Carveyor consisted of many small cubicles or cars carrying ten people riding on a flat conveyor belt from point A to point B. The belt rode on a series of motorized rollers. The purpose of the motorized rollers was to facilitate the gradual acceleration and deceleration speeds on the conveyor belt and overcome the tendency of all belts to stretch at start up and during shutdown. At point "A" passengers would enter a Speedwalk running parallel to the belts and cars of the Carveyor. The cars would be moving at the same speed as the Speedwalk; the passengers would enter the cars and be seated, while the motorized rollers would increase the speed of the cars up to the traveling speed (which would be preset depending on the distance to be covered). At point B Passengers could disembark and by means of a series of flat slower belts (Speedwalks) go to other Carveyors to other destinations or out to the street. The cars at point B would continue on rollers around a semicircle and then reverse the process carrying passengers back to point A. The initial installation was to be the 42nd Street Shuttle in New York City between Times Square and Grand Central station.

The first mention of the Carveyor in a hardback book was in There's Adventure in Civil Engineering by Neil P. Ruzic (1958), one of a series of books published by Popular Mechanics in the 1950s in their "Career" series. In the book the Carveyor was already installed and operational in downtown Los Angeles.

Colonel Sydney H. Bingham, Chairman of the New York City Board of Transportation, had several meetings with a group of architects who were trying to revamp the whole New York City Subway system in the heart of town to connect Pennsylvania Station, Madison Square Garden, Times Square, Grand Central and several new office complexes together. Several of these architects were involved in other programs, and in later years many variations of the Carveyor people movers were developed.

In November 1954 the New York City Transit Authority issued an order to Goodyear and Stephens-Adamson to build a complete Carveyor system between Times Square and Grand Central. A brief summary and confirmation can be found in Time magazine on November 15, 1954. under the heading "Subway of the Future". The cost was to be under $4 million, but the order was never fulfilled due to political difficulties.

Chocolate World in Hershey, Pennsylvania, Disneyland in California, and Walt Disney World in Florida are among many locations that have used variations of the Carveyor concept.

=== Other developments ===
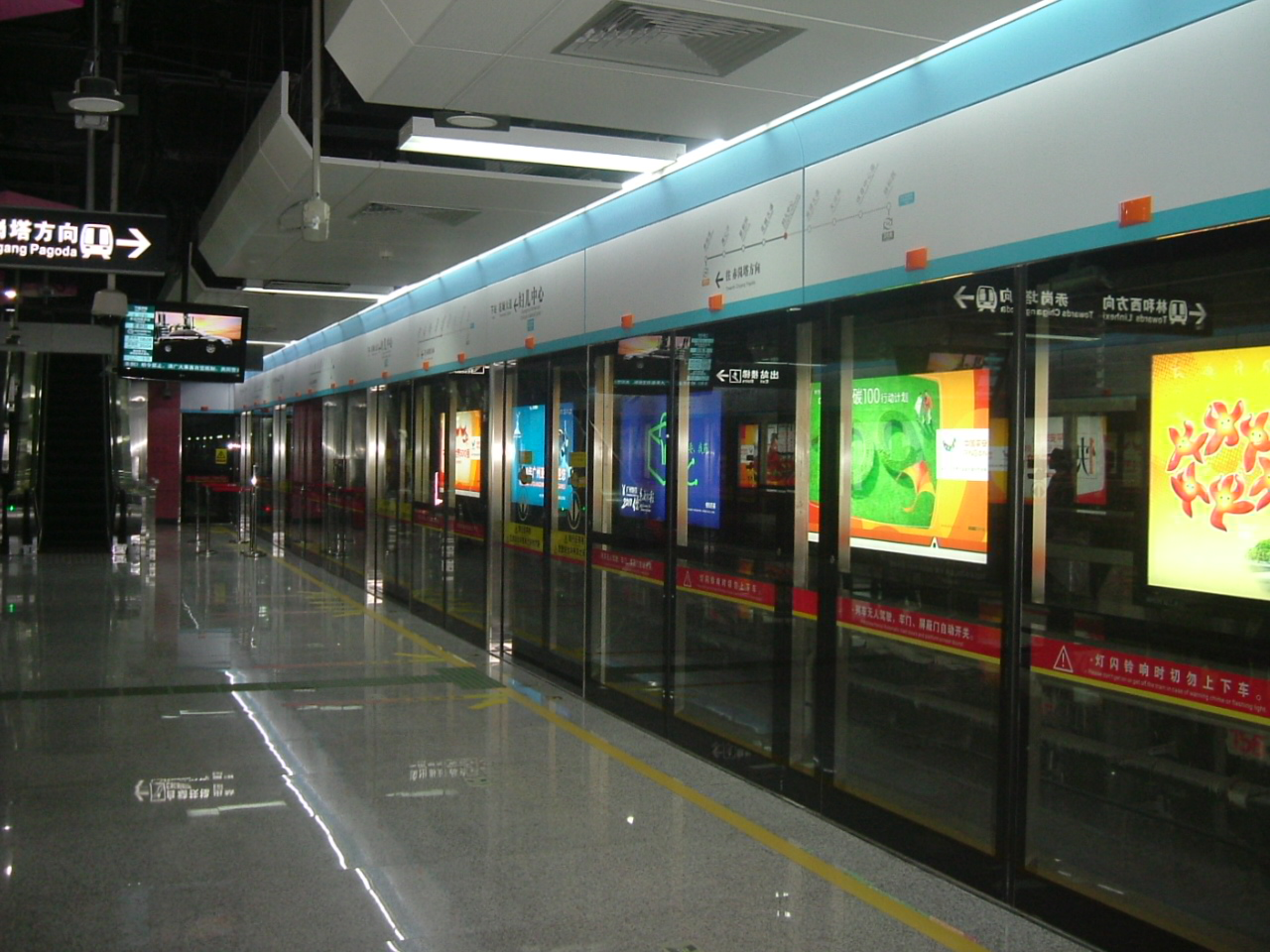
Platform of Zhujiang New Town APM in Guangzhou, Guangdong, China

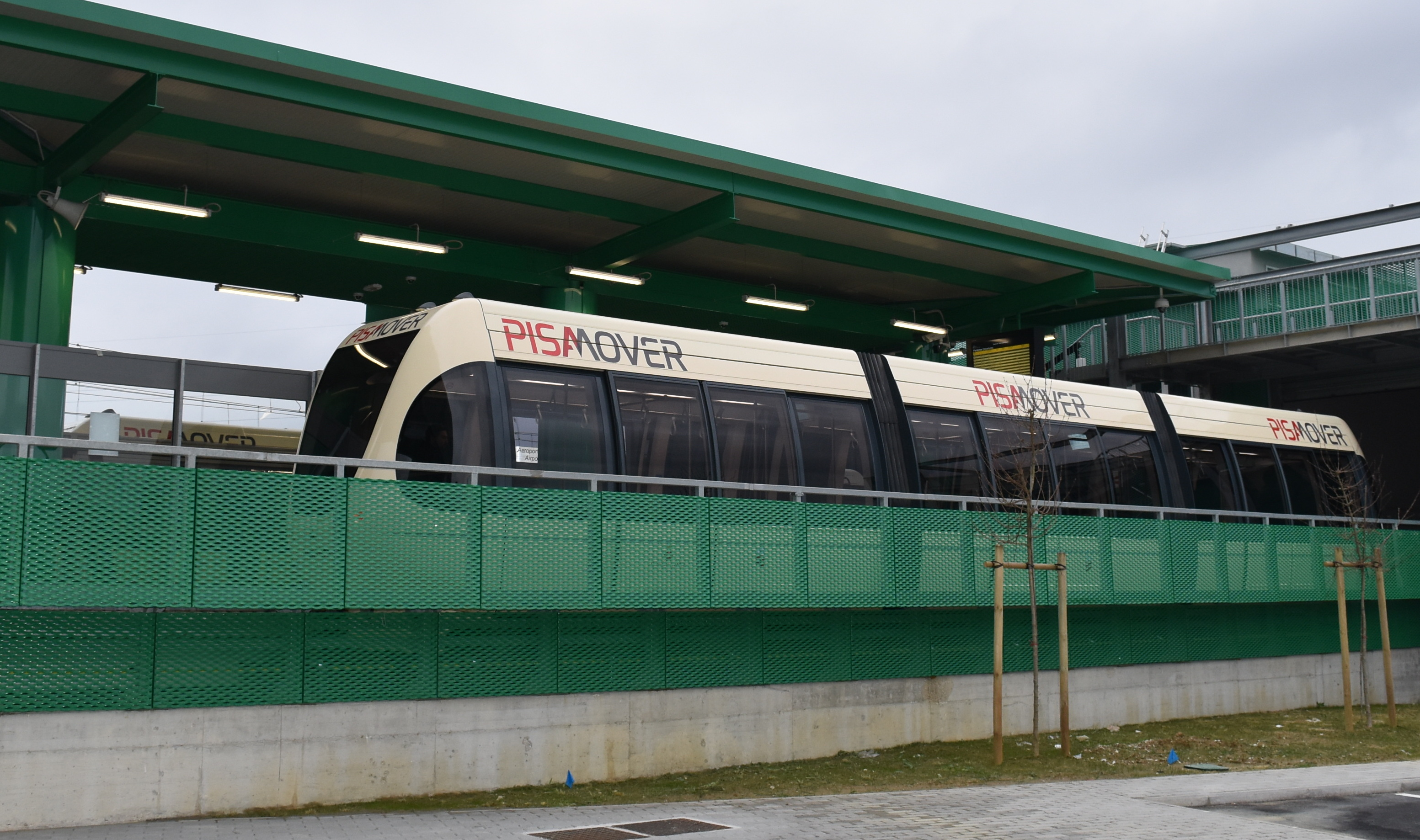
Pisamover in Pisa, Italy

The term 'people mover' was used by Walt Disney, when he and his Imagineers were working on the new 1967 Tomorrowland at Disneyland. The name was used as a working title for a new attraction, the PeopleMover. According to Imagineer Bob Gurr, "the name got stuck," and it was no longer a working title.

Starting in the late 1960s and into the 1970s, people movers were the topic of intense development around the world. Worried about the growing congestion and pollution in downtown areas due to the spread of cars, many countries started studying mass transit systems that would lower capital costs to the point where any city could afford to deploy them. Most of these systems used elevated guideways, which were much less expensive to deploy than tunnels. However, elevating the track causes problems with noise, so traditional steel-wheel-on-rail solutions were rare as they squealed when rounding bends in the rails. Rubber tired solutions were common, but some systems used hovercraft techniques or various magnetic levitation systems.

Two major government funded APM projects are notable. In Germany, Mannesmann Demag and Messerschmitt-Bölkow-Blohm developed a system known as Cabinentaxi during the 1970s. Cabinentaxi featured small cars with from four to eight seats that were called to pick up passengers on-demand and drove directly to their destination. The stations were "offline", allowing the cabs to stop by moving off the main lines while other cars continued to their destinations. The system was designed so the cars could be adapted to run on top or bottom of the track (but not easily converted from one to the other), allowing dual-track movements from a single elevated guideway only slightly wider than the cars. A test track was completed in 1975 and ran until development was completed in 1979, but no deployments followed and the companies abandoned the system shortly thereafter.

In the U.S., a 1966 federal bill provided funding that led to the development of APM systems under the Downtown People Mover Program. Four systems were developed, Rohr's ROMAG, LTV's AirTrans, Ford's APT and Otis Elevator's hovercraft design. A major presentation of the systems was organized as TRANSPO'72 at Dulles International Airport, where the various systems were presented to delegations from numerous cities in the US. Prototype systems and test tracks were built during the 1970s.

One notable example was Pittsburgh's Skybus, which was proposed by the Port Authority of Allegheny County to replace its streetcar system, which, having large stretches of private right of way, was not suited for bus conversion. A short demonstration line was set up in South Park and large tracts of land were secured for its facilities. However, opposition arose to the notion that it would replace the streetcar system. This, combined with the immaturity of the technology and other factors, led the Port Authority to abandon the project and pursue alternatives. By the start of the 1980s most politicians had lost interest in the concept and the project was repeatedly de-funded in the early 1980s. Only two APMs were developed as a part of the People Mover Program in the U.S., the Metromover in Miami, and the Detroit People Mover. The Jacksonville Skyway was built in the late 1980s.

== From development to implementation ==
Although many systems were generally considered failures, several APM systems developed by other groups have been much more successful. Lighter systems with shorter tracks are widely deployed at airports; the world's first airport people movers, the Tampa International Airport People Movers, were installed in 1971 at Tampa International Airport in the United States. APMs have now become common at large airports and hospitals in the United States.

Driverless metros have become common in Europe and parts of Asia. The economics of automated trains tend to reduce the scale so tied to "mass" transit (the largest operating expense is the driver's salary, which is only affordable if very large numbers of passengers are paying fares), so that small-scale installations are feasible. Thus cities normally thought of as too small to build a metro (e.g. Rennes, Lausanne, Brescia, etc.) are now doing so.

On September 30, 2006, the Peachliner in Komaki, Aichi Prefecture, Japan, became that nation's first people mover to cease operations.

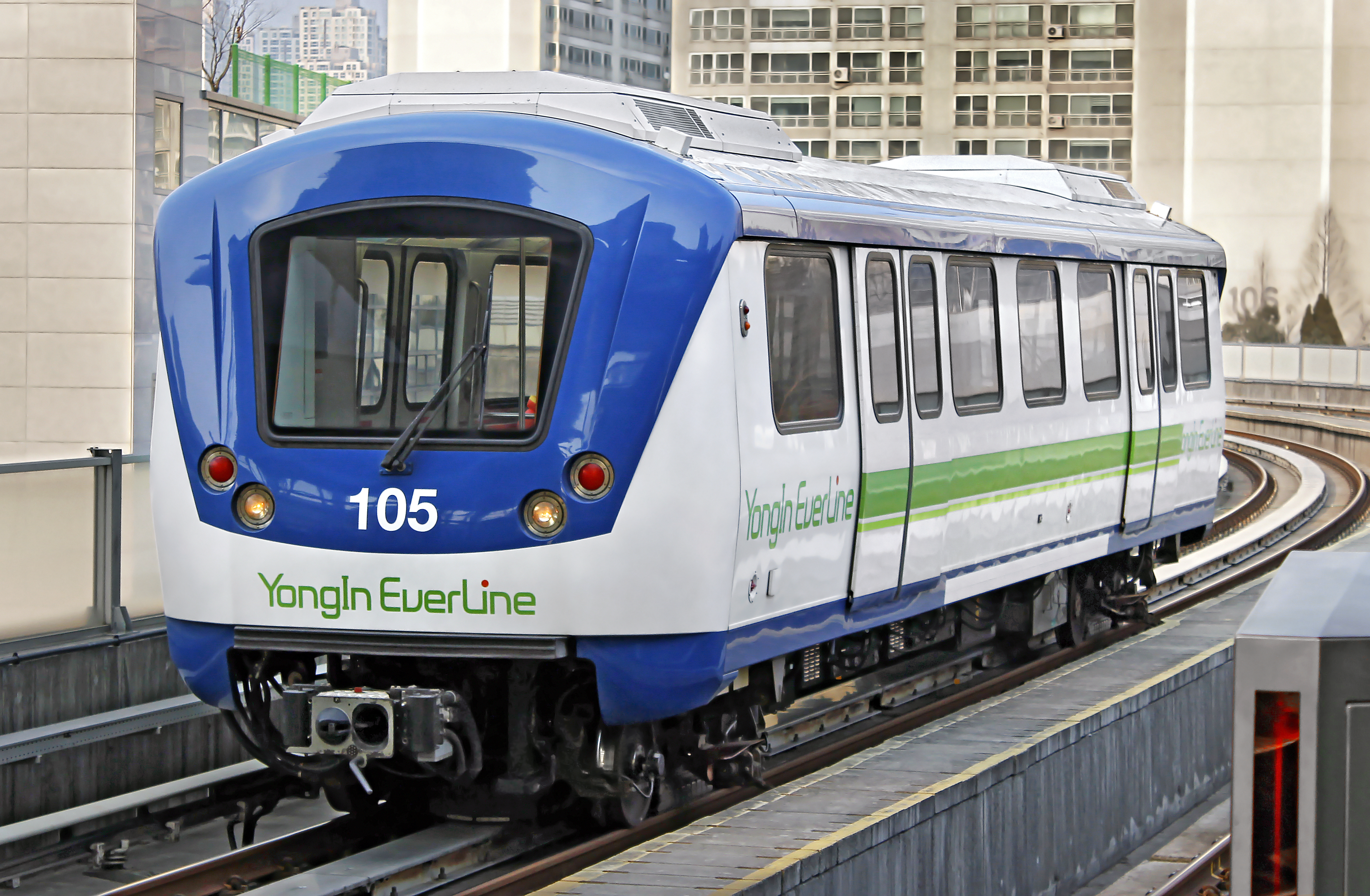
EverLine Innovia ART 200 train in Yongin, South Korea

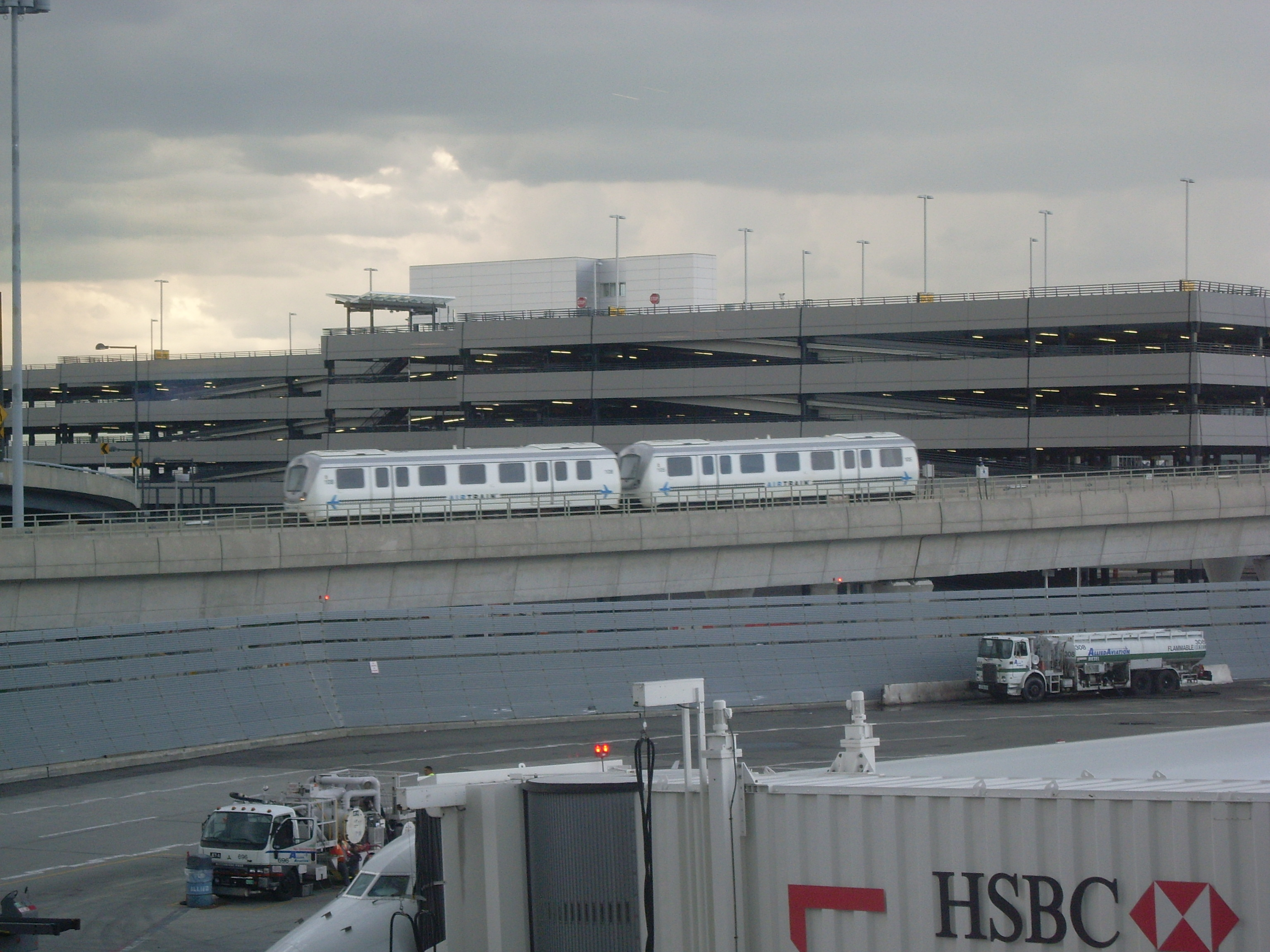
Two-car AirTrain JFK on elevated guideway

== Manufacturers ==
=== Heavy APMs ===
- Hitachi Rail STS
- Bombardier Innovia Metro
- Bombardier Innovia Monorail
- Kawasaki Heavy Industries Rolling Stock Company
- Mitsubishi Heavy Industries
- Véhicule Automatique Léger (now part of Siemens Mobility)
- Hyundai Rotem

=== Light APMs ===
- Hitachi Rail STS
- Bombardier Innovia APM (now part of Alstom)
- Doppelmayr Cable Car
- HTI Group (Leitner Ropeways/Poma)
- Mitsubishi Heavy Industries Crystal Mover
- Parry People Movers (PPM)
- Hyundai Rotem

== Examples ==
=== Airports ===
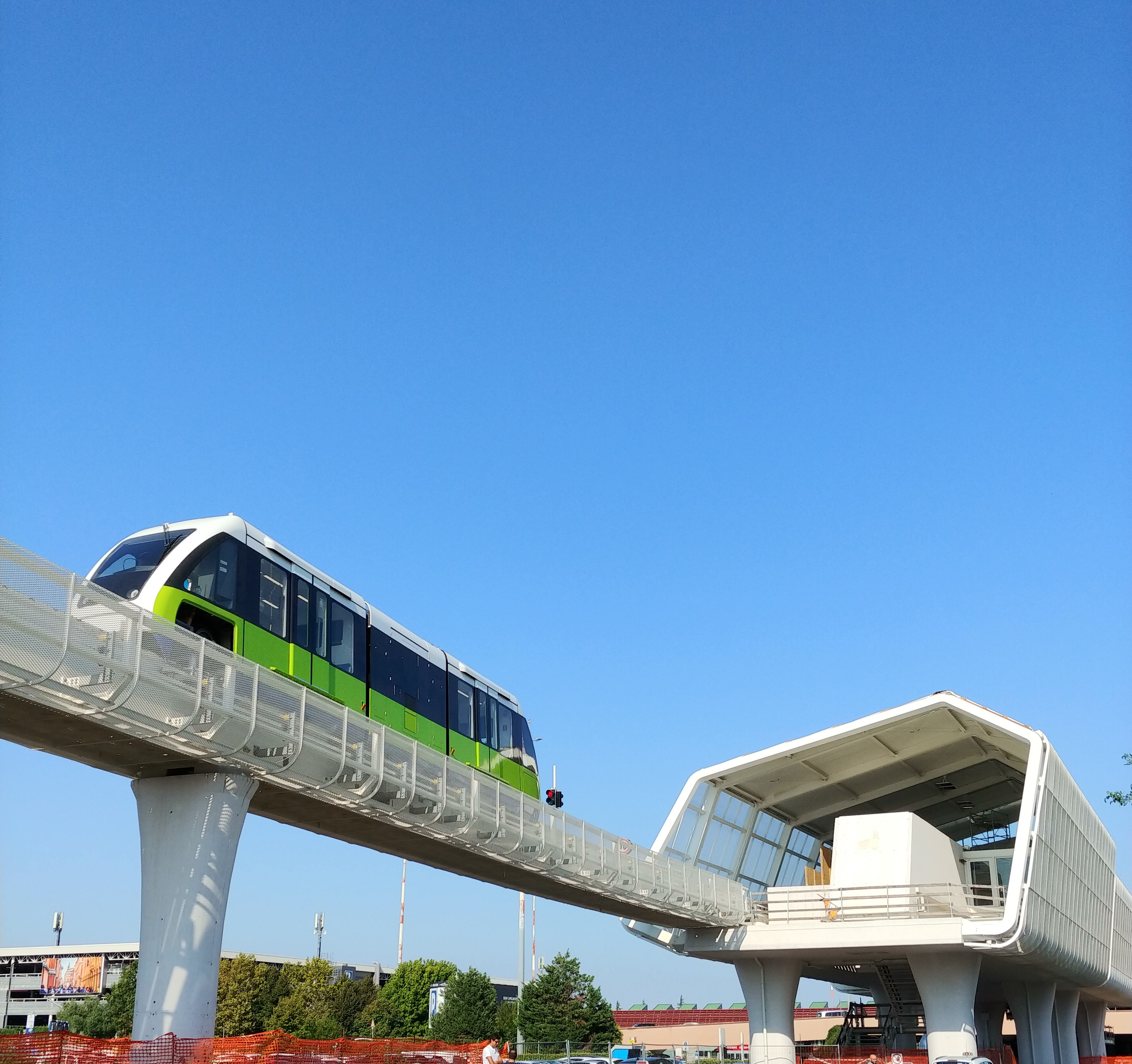
Marconi Express in Bologna, Italy, links Bologna Guglielmo Marconi Airport to Bologna Centrale railway station with an intermediate station

Many large international airports around the world feature people mover systems to transport passengers between terminals or within a terminal itself. Some people mover systems at airports connect with other public transportation systems to allow passengers to travel into the airport's city.

=== Urban transit ===
==== Austria ====
- Serfaus: U-Bahn (fully underground)

==== China ====
- Guangzhou: Zhujiang New Town Automated People Mover System
- Shanghai: Pujiang line
- Wuhan: Optics Valley Suspended Monorail

==== Germany ====
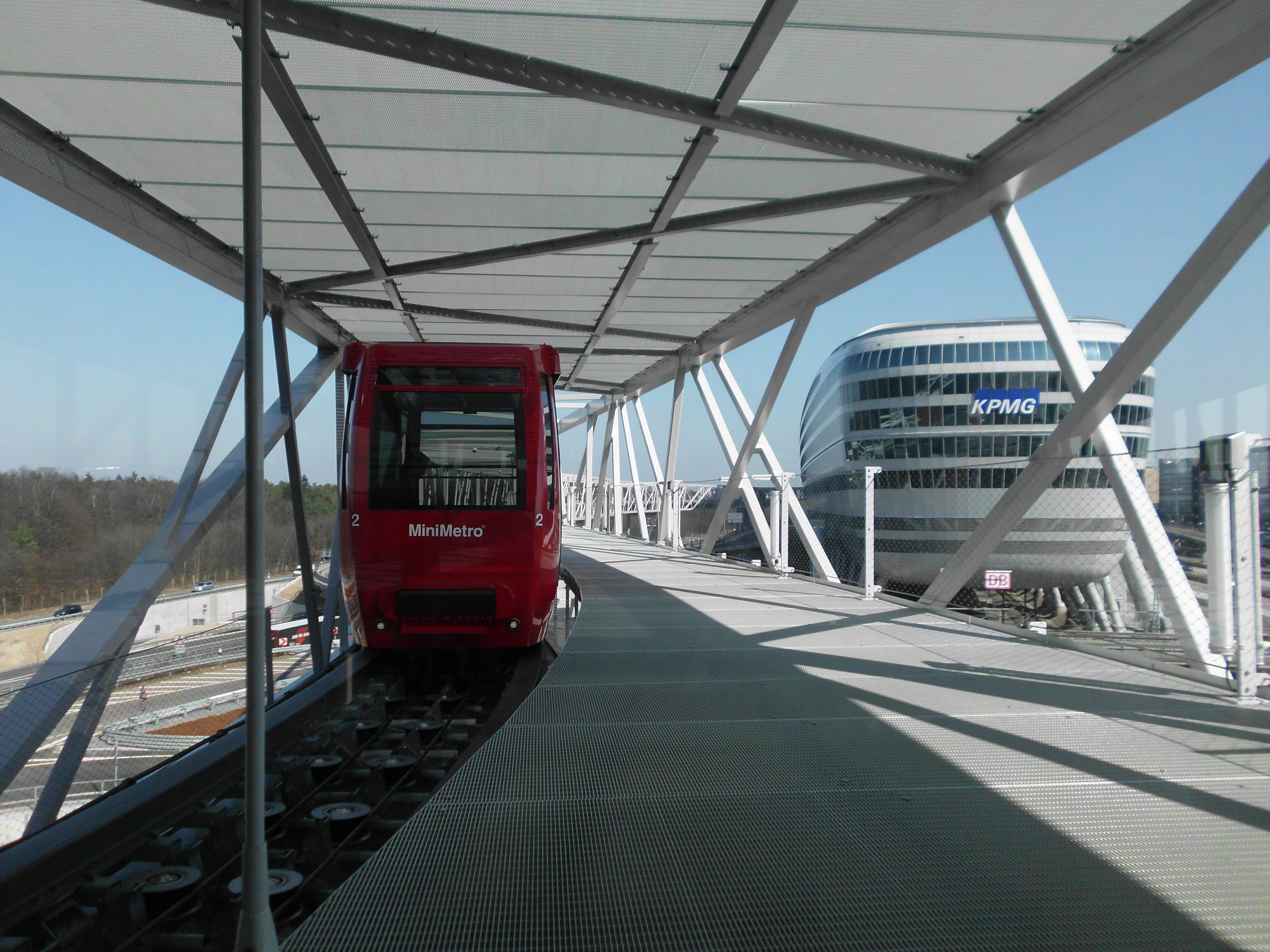
MiniMetro-people mover attending the multistorey car park of The Squaire

- Dortmund: H-Bahn Dortmund
- Frankfurt: Squaire-Metro

==== Italy ====
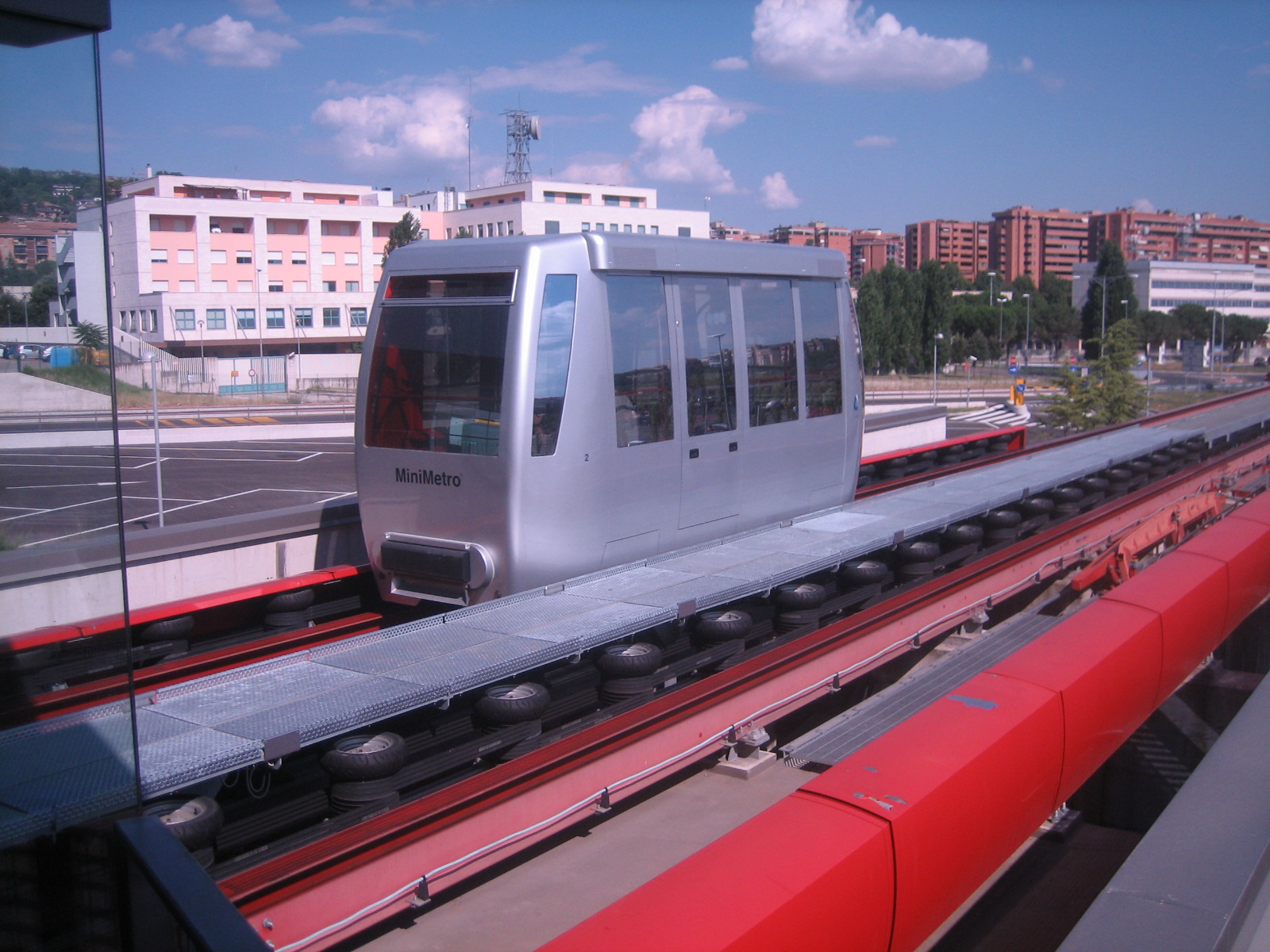
Automated MiniMetro in Perugia, Italy

- Perugia: Minimetrò Perugia
- Milan: MeLA
- Venice: Venice People Mover
- Bologna: Marconi Express (urban to airport)
- Pisa: Pisamover (urban to airport)

==== Japan ====
- Nagoya: Linimo
- Sakura: Yamaman Yūkarigaoka Line
- Tokorozawa: Seibu Yamaguchi Line

==== Portugal ====
- Lisbon, Oeiras: SATUOeiras (closed)

==== Singapore ====
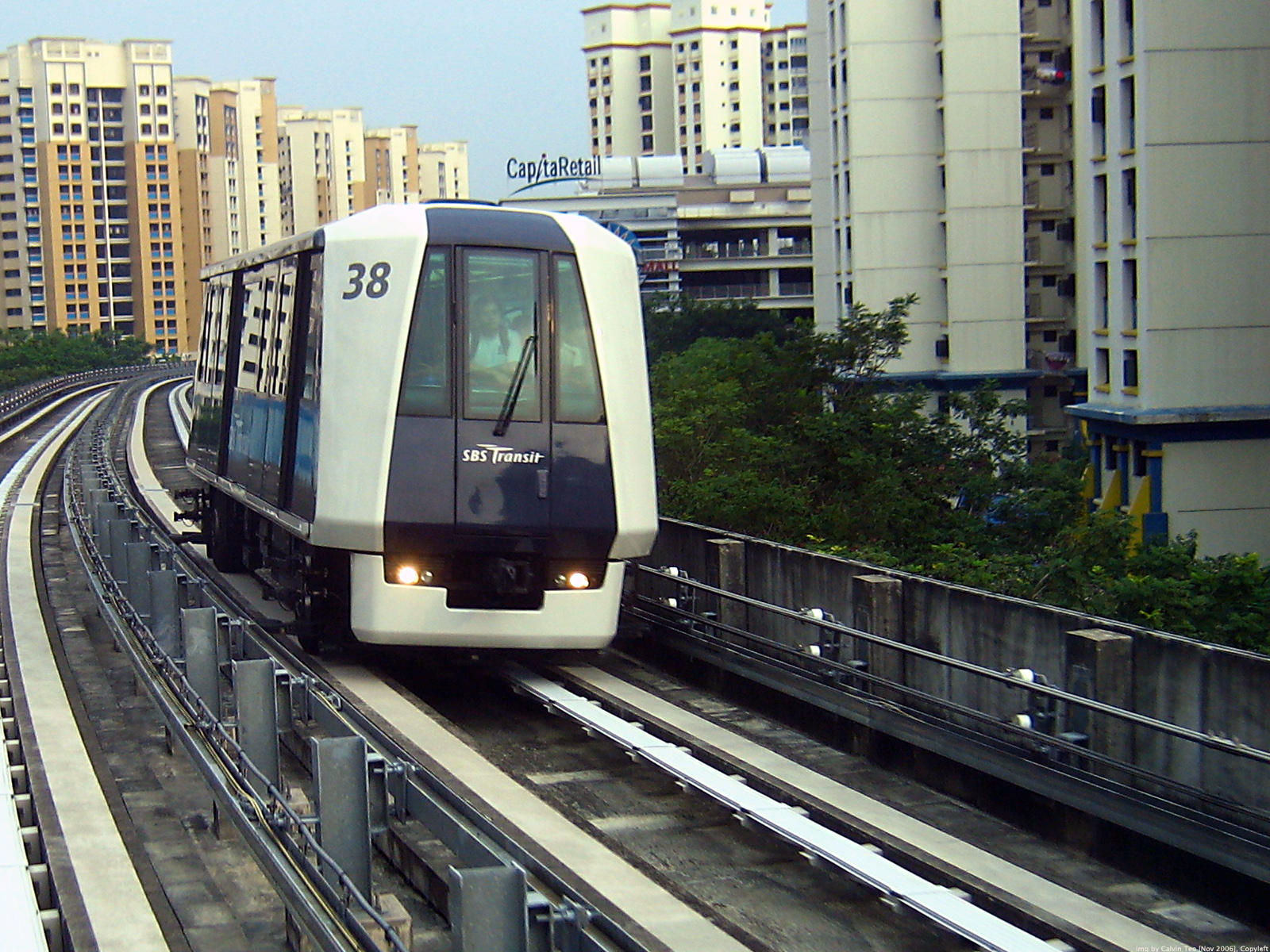
Sengkang LRT line, A Mitsubishi Heavy Industries Crystal Mover on the East Loop, Singapore

- Bukit Panjang: Bukit Panjang Light Rail Transit
- Punggol: Punggol Light Rail Transit
- Sengkang: Sengkang Light Rail Transit
- Sentosa: Sentosa Express

==== South Korea ====
- Incheon: Incheon Airport Maglev (urban to airport)
- Wolmido: Wolmi Sea Train
- Yongin: Everline

==== Spain ====
- Zaragoza: Plaza Imperial Monorail

==== Thailand ====
- Bangkok: Gold Line

==== United Arab Emirates ====
- Masdar City: Masdar City Personal Rapid Transit

==== United States ====
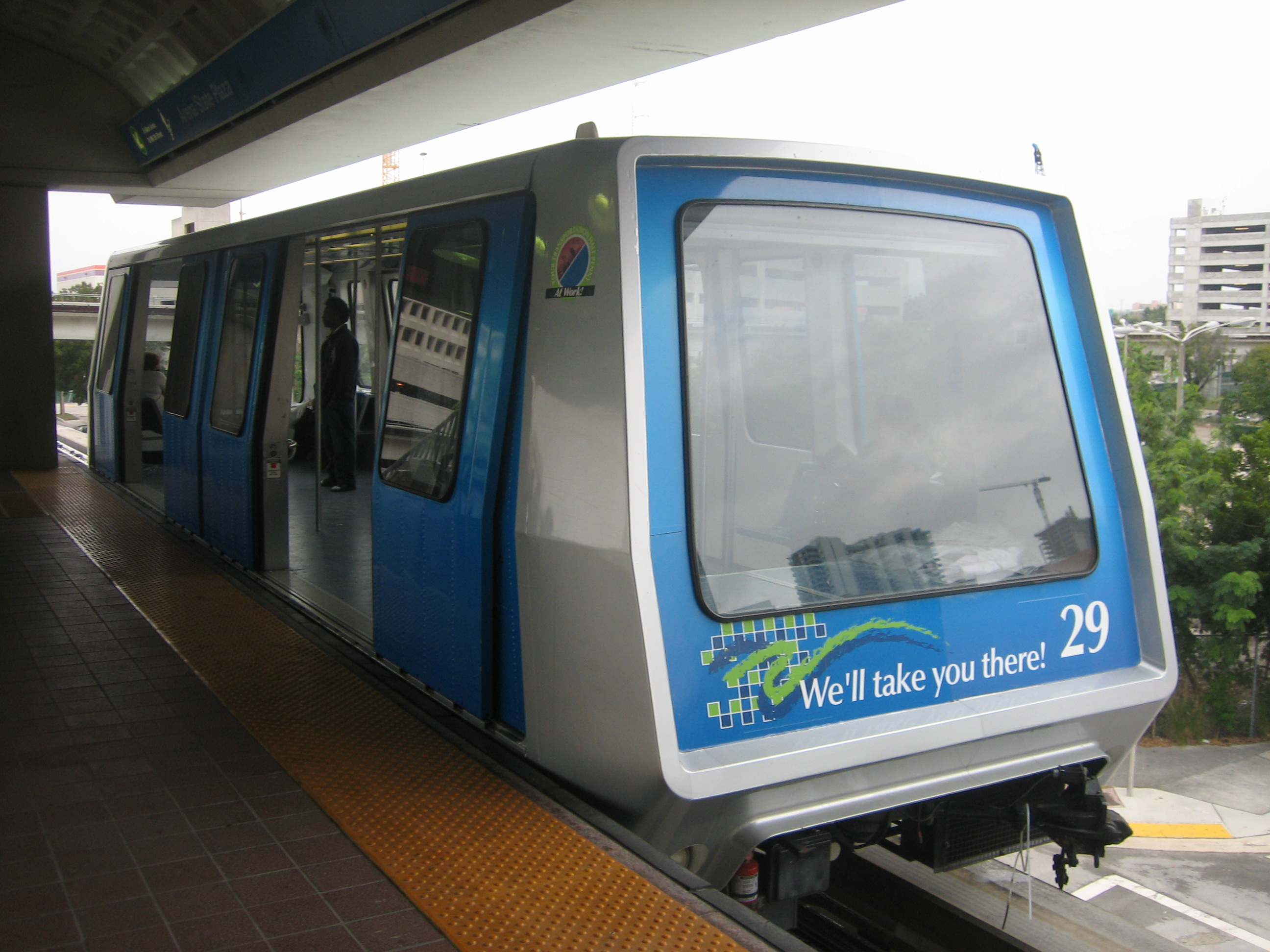
Metromover, Miami, Florida, United States

- Detroit, Michigan: Detroit People Mover
- Jacksonville, Florida: Jacksonville Skyway
- Las Colinas, Irving, Texas: Las Colinas APT System (closed)
- Morgantown, West Virginia: Morgantown Personal Rapid Transit
- Miami, Florida: Miami-Dade Metromover

==== Venezuela ====
- Caracas: Cabletren Bolivariano

=== Others ===
==== Canada ====
- Montreal, Quebec: Minirail (The Minirail automated monorail at Expo 67, which incorporated track and rolling stock from the 1964 Swiss National Exhibition)

==== China ====
- The SK people mover in Shanghai operates in the Bund Sightseeing Tunnel.

==== Hong Kong ====
- Hong Kong: Disneyland Resort line (urban transit connecting to amusement park)
- Hong Kong: Hong Kong Ocean Park Ocean Express (transit connecting the two areas of the amusement park)

==== Indonesia ====
- Jakarta: Tram Mover Garuda Kencana at Taman Mini Indonesia Indah theme park. Formerly an aeromovel, currently the people mover is diesel-powered.

==== Japan ====
- Slope car, a small automated monorail found in various parts of Japan, can be considered as a simple form of people mover.

==== South Korea ====
- SkyCube in Suncheon, a PRT connects the site of 2013 Suncheon Garden Expo Korea to a station in the wetlands "Buffer Area" next to the Suncheon Literature Museum

==== United States ====
- Aiea, Hawaii – A monorail at the Pearlridge Center connects the Uptown part of the mall to the Downtown part of the mall.
- Anaheim, California – Disneyland Monorail System.
- Bay Lake, Florida: Walt Disney World Monorail System.
- Fairfield, Ohio – Jungle Jim's International Market monorail in Fairfield, Ohio, brings riders from a remote parking lot to the Oscar Events Center; cars were originally used at nearby Kings Island.
- Huntsville, Alabama: Huntsville Hospital People Mover Connects different buildings of the Huntsville Hospital System.
- Indianapolis, Indiana: Indiana University Health People Mover (service suspended indefinitely in February 2019)
- Las Vegas, Nevada: In addition to the Las Vegas Monorail, several people mover systems are located in the city. Three connect the Harry Reid International Airport terminals 1 and 3 to their C-, D-, and E-gates. The Hard Rock-Treasure Island Tram connects Hard Rock Las Vegas to Treasure Island Hotel and Casino. The Mandalay Bay Tram connects Excalibur, Luxor, and Mandalay Bay. The City Center Tram connects Park MGM, The Crystals in City Center, and the Bellagio.
- Memphis, Tennessee – Memphis Suspension Railway (a short suspended monorail) connects Mud Island in the Mississippi River to Memphis
- Orlando, Florida: The Hogwarts Express attraction, a funicular railroad within Universal Orlando Resort that connects the two The Wizarding World of Harry Potter sections, Hogsmeade at Islands of Adventure and Diagon Alley at Universal Studios Florida
- Reno, Nevada: Circus Circus Reno sky shuttle operates between hotel towers in Reno, Nevada.
- Washington, D.C.: United States Capitol Subway System Dirksen/Hart Line

== See also ==
- Automated guideway transit
- Guide bar
- Guided bus
- Guide rail
- Intermodal passenger transport
- Light metro
- Moving walkway
- Personal rapid transit
- Rail transport in Walt Disney Parks and Resorts
- Rapid transit systems using linear motor propulsion
- Roll way
- Schmid peoplemover
- Slope car
