= People mover (disambiguation) =

A people mover is an automated guideway transit system.

People mover or People Mover may also refer to:

- People Mover (Anchorage), a public transportation agency in Anchorage, Alaska, United States
- People Mover (Venice), a people mover in Venice, Italy
- PeopleMover (Disneyland), a former Disneyland attraction
- PeopleMover (Magic Kingdom), a Walt Disney World Resort Magic Kingdom attraction, which is originally the Tomorrowland Transit Authority PeopleMover
- Detroit People Mover, Michigan, United States
- Indiana University Health People Mover
- SkyLink (Los Angeles International Airport), formerly known as the LAX Automated People Mover, an automated train serving Los Angeles International Airport
- Parry People Movers, a company manufacturing lightweight trams and railcars
- Minivan/MPV, a hatchback type vehicle
- Niagara Parks Commission People Mover, Ontario, Canada
- Schmid peoplemover, an elevator capable of crossing a road
- "People Moover", a song by A Guy Called Gerald from his 2010 album Tronic Jazz / The Berlin Sessions

== See also ==
- Moving walkway
