= Huntsville Hospital Tram System =

Tram system in Huntsville, Alabama

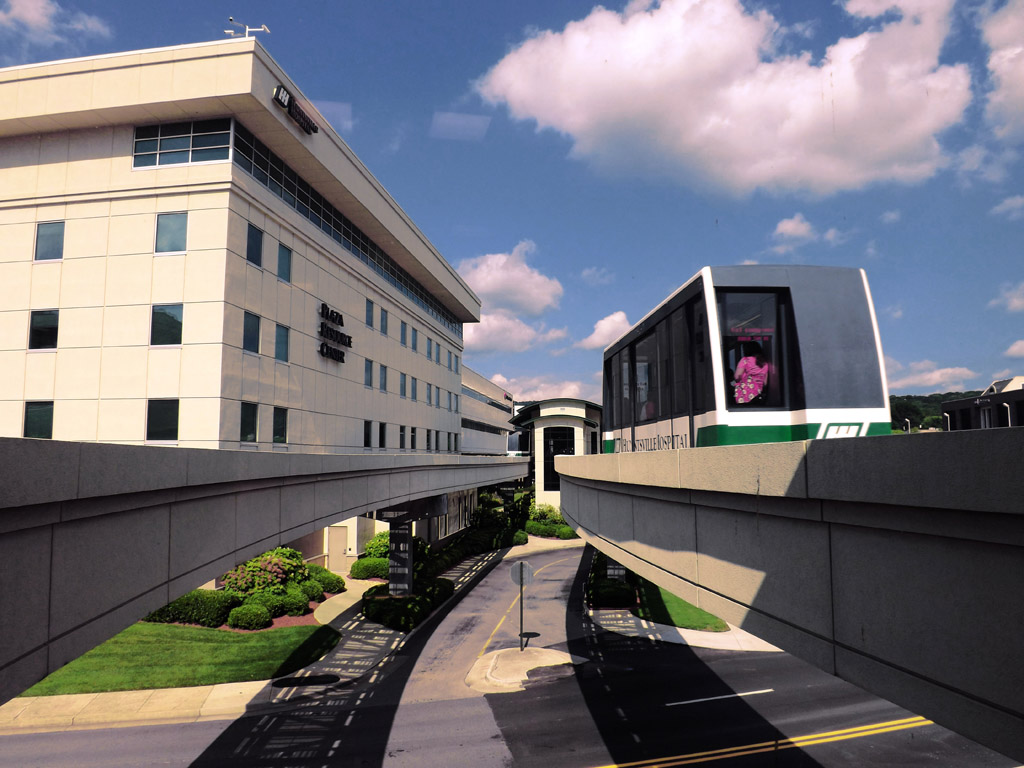

Overview
- Area served: Huntsville Hospital campus
- Locale: Huntsville, Alabama, US
- Transit type: People mover
- Number of stations: 4

Operation
- Began operation: 19 June 2002
- Operator: Huntsville Hospital System
- Character: Elevated
- Number of vehicles: 2

Technical
- System length: 1,890 feet (580 m)
- Track gauge: Concrete guideway

The Huntsville Hospital Tram System is an automated people mover system located as part of the Huntsville Hospital System complex in Huntsville, Alabama, United States. Operating on a 1,890-foot (580 m) concrete guideway, the trams serve to connect the Huntsville Hospital with the Huntsville Hospital for Women & Children. At the time of completion, this was the second hospital people mover system in the United States after the Duke University Medical Center Patient Rapid Transit. As of August 2025, this is the only automated people mover system completed in the state of Alabama.

== Description ==
Developed by Poma-Otis Transportation Systems, a joint venture of Poma and the Otis Elevator Company, and constructed by Brasfield & Gorrie, the cable-driven steel-on-steel system was completed at a final cost of $10.9 million. The two 1,890-foot (580 m) concrete guideways are elevated 30 feet (9.1 m) above the surface. Costing $280,000 annually to operate, the Huntsville Hospital Tram System handles approximately 2,200 passengers per day.

The vehicles were designed by the Gangloff company of Switzerland. Each car can handle three seated and 38 standing passengers. Additionally, each car was designed to accommodate the largest bed in use by the hospital for the transport of patients.

The system runs in an east-west direction between the main Huntsville Hospital building and the Huntsville Hospital for Women & Children with intermediate stops at the Plaza Resource Center and the Franklin Medical Tower. The system offers two separate modes for reaching the various stations, a Local Mode and an Express Mode. The Local Mode makes all four stops, primarily traveling along the northern track. The Express Mode only travels between the two termini, primarily along the southern track.

== History ==
The idea of developing a tram system for Huntsville Hospital was initially proposed in mid-1997.

By December 1998, plans for the system moved forward after gaining approval of several property variances from the Huntsville Board of Zoning Adjustment to allow for its construction. By early 2000 construction of the system would commence, with an initial opening slated for summer 2001. However, due to delays and the need for enhanced security along the system in the wake of the September 11 attacks, the system would not open until June 19, 2002.

By 2004, use of the tram resulted in the elimination of approximately 4,500 annual ambulance trips and the use of two full-time shuttle vans between the two main facilities. Due to this reduction in the number of vehicle trips made, Huntsville Hospital was awarded a 2004 Industrial Air Pollution Control Achievement Award from the city of Huntsville Air Pollution Control Board.
