= Wolmi Sea Train =

Monorail line in Incheon, South Korea

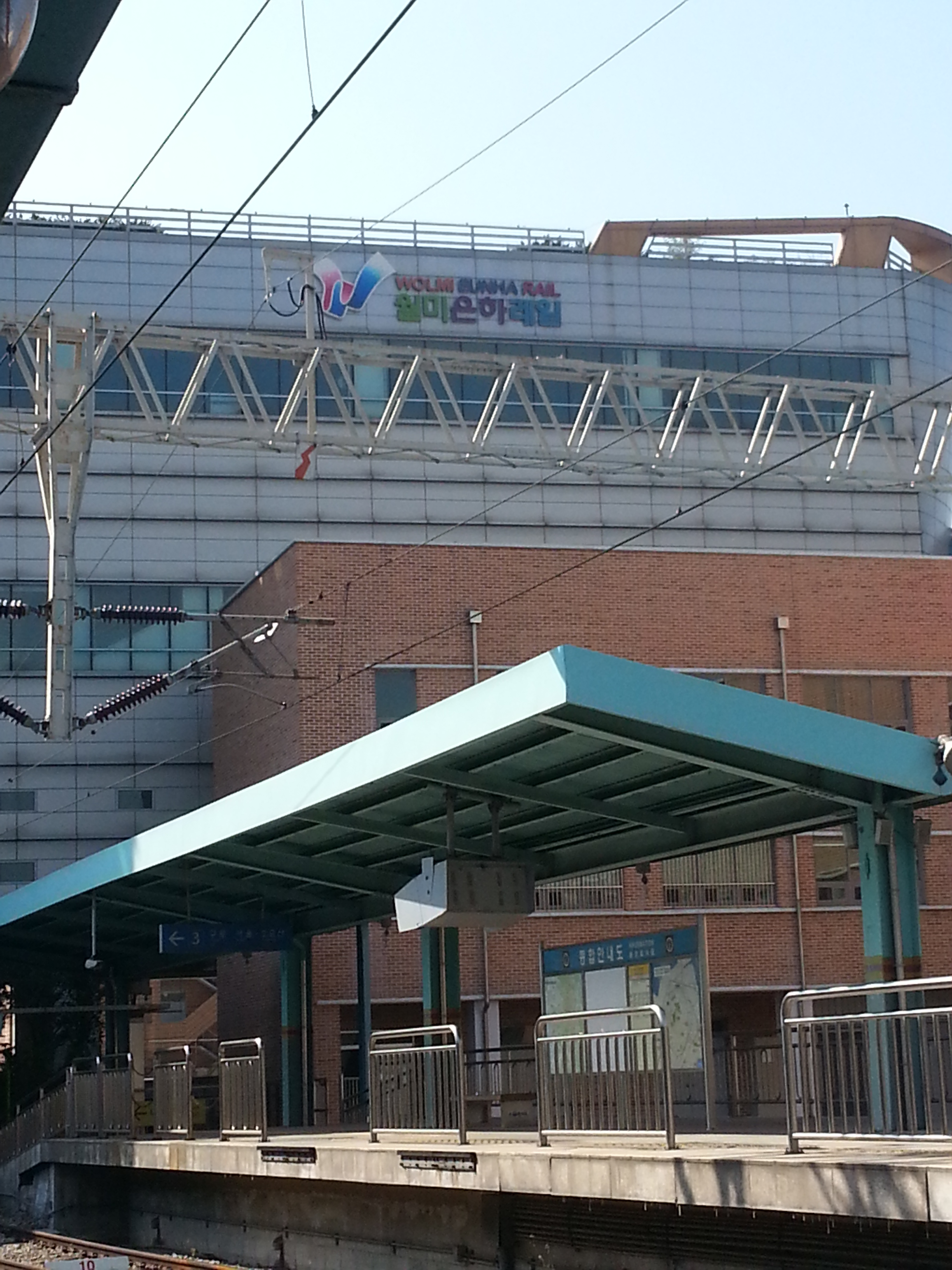
Wolmi Eunha station

The Wolmi Sea Train (월미바다열차), formerly known as Wolmi Galaxy Rail, is a monorail on the island of Wolmido in Incheon, South Korea. The monorail line has 4 stations and covers 6.1 km connecting Wolmido Island to Incheon Station, the west terminus of Seoul Subway Line 1 and the Suin–Bundang Line. 1.15 km is double-tracked, but the loop around Wolmido (3.94 km) is single-track. Phase 2, if built, would have added 2 km single track connecting to Dong-Incheon station, also on Metro Line 1, with a potential Phase 3 looping back to Incheon station. The system is the first in the world to use Urbanaut technology, whose selling point is an inverse T-shaped track: large wheels run on the horizontal part of the track, while small wheels press against the rail and keep it in place.

The project was started in 2007, where it was originally designed to be a major monorail carrying 70 passengers. The line was scheduled to open in March 2010, but opening was repeatedly postponed. The project has a poor safety record. In April 2010, a test vehicle collided with a rail inspection vehicle, causing it to crash into a station, parts of which collapsed onto the street below. In August 2010, a wheel falling from the vehicle on a test run injured a pedestrian. In May 2012, a current collector fell off the train, although there were no injuries. In 2011, Joongang Daily reported that construction had been indefinitely suspended due to "colossal corruption", and that what had been built was set to be demolished due to "safety issues". It was reported the system was not built to the specifications of the Urbanaut. A technical inspection in May 2013 revealed numerous unresolved safety issues. In August 2014, it was announced that the monorail was unsafe and the project would be abandoned.

The cost of the entire system, originally estimated at US$60 million, had risen to 110 billion South Korean won (approx. US$100 million) before construction was suspended. A revised plan in 2015 cut the size of the trains to carrying 24 passengers. Construction based on the revised plan began in February 2015 aimed to complete in Fall 2016. It was eventually opened on October 8, 2019.

== List of stations ==
Route			Station Name English	Station Name Hangul	Station Name Hanja	Transfer	Distance km	Total Distance	Location	
●			Wolmi Sea	월미바다	月尾바다	( via Incheon)			Incheon	Jung-gu
●			Wolmi Park	월미공원	月尾公園				Incheon	Jung-gu
↓	↖								Incheon	Jung-gu
●		↖	Wolmi Culture Street	월미문화의거리	月尾文化의거리				Incheon	Jung-gu
↘	●	↗	The Museum of Korea Emigration History	박물관	博物館				Incheon	Jung-gu

== See also ==
- Subways in South Korea
- Seoul Metropolitan Subway
