= Huntsville Hospital System =

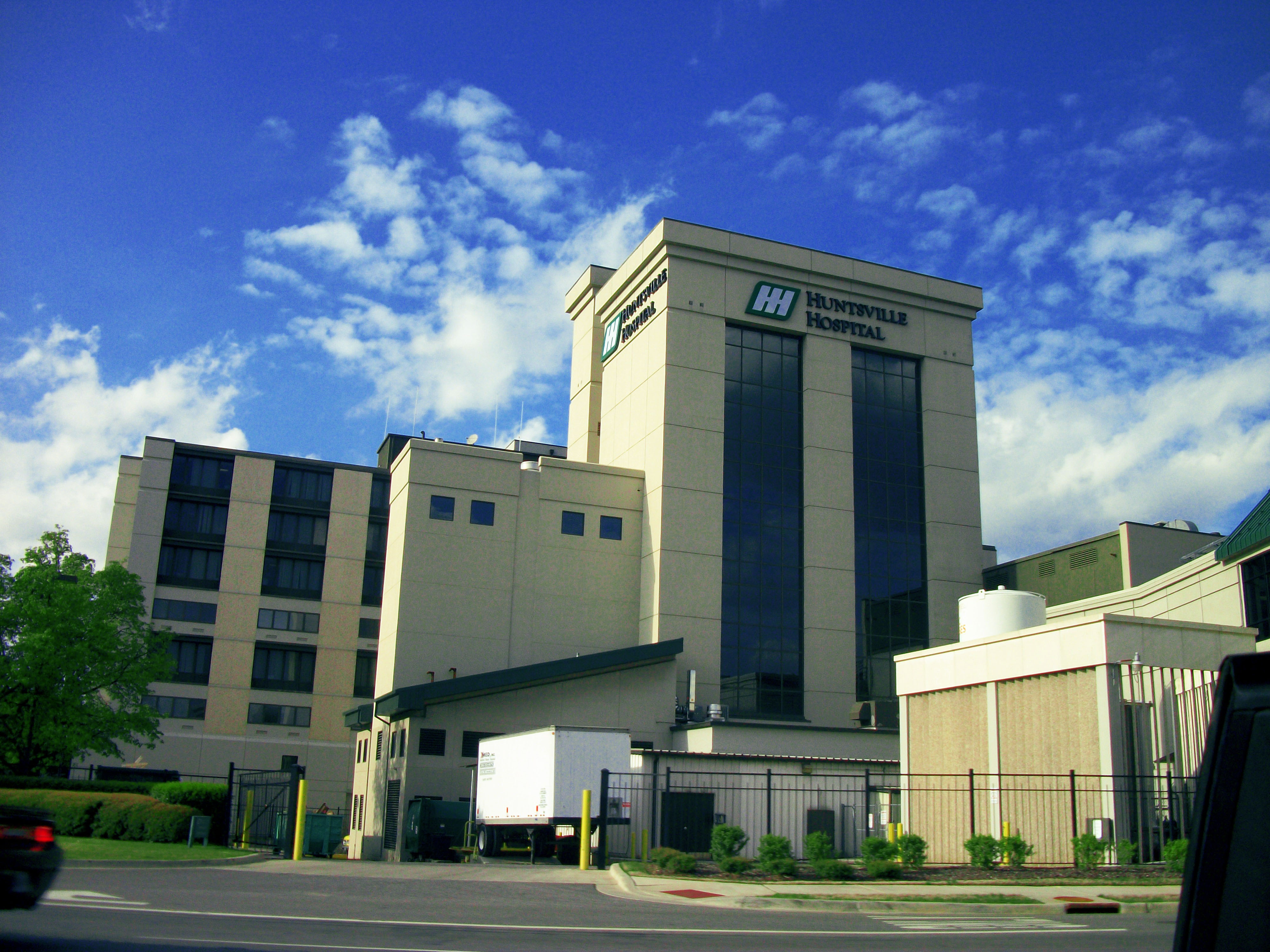
- The main building of Huntsville Hospital

Geography
- Location: 101 Sivley Road, Huntsville, Alabama, United States
- Coordinates: 34°43′16″N 86°34′37″W

Organization
- Care system: Public

Services
- Emergency department: Level I Trauma)
- Beds: 941

Helipads
- Helipad: FAA LID: AL36
Number	Length		Surface
Number	ft	m	Surface
H1	30	9	concrete rooftop

History
- Founded: 1895

Links
- Website: www.hhsys.org
- Lists: Hospitals in Alabama

The Huntsville Hospital Health System (also known as Huntsville Hospital) is a public, not-for-profit hospital organization consisting of several sites and buildings, originating in the downtown area of Huntsville, Alabama. The Huntsville Hospital Health System has evolved and now either owns or works with several other hospitals in Alabama. It has around 20,000 employees, 2,000 nurses and 650 physicians.

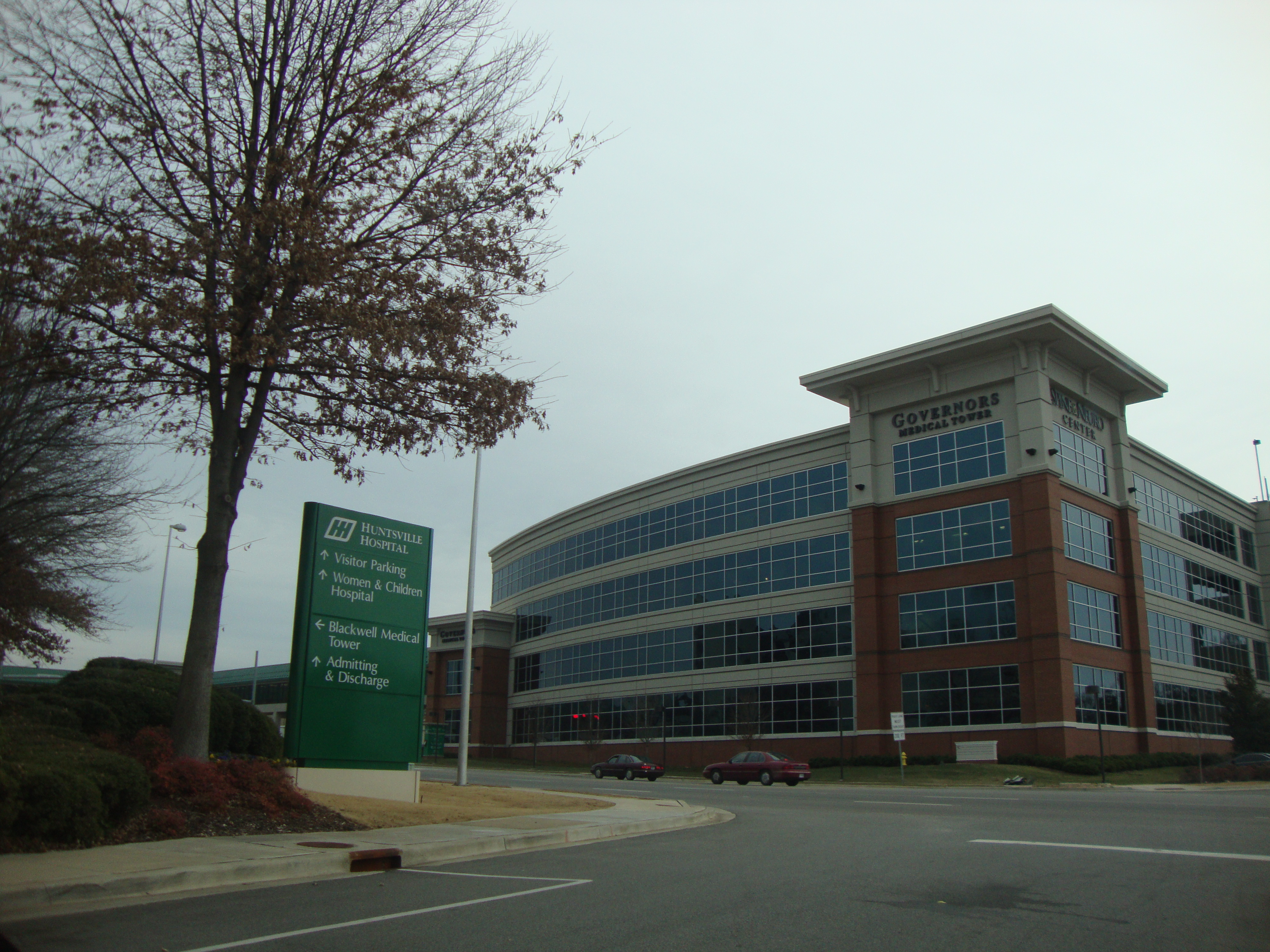
Governors Medical Tower

The hospital has no official ties to any college or university. It is only used for clinical rotations by students from the UAB School of Medicine, their family practice residency program, and local nursing, medical laboratory science, and pharmacy students.

== History ==
1895 – A small infirmary is opened on Mill Street. The Infirmary was the result of the United Charities of Huntsville, a group dedicated to helping the sick and needy. The rent was $12.50 per month.

1904 – The Infirmary moves to a new location. The house had previously been owned by Mollie Teal, who left the home to the city. 112 patients were treated in the Infirmary during the year.

1916 – The city appeals to the State Health Department for help after typhoid fever devastates the community. Dr. Carl Grote Sr., later to become known as the patriarch of Huntsville Hospital, answers the call.

1918 – An outbreak of Spanish Flu ravishes Huntsville. Almost 400 people died of the disease in less than four months. Dedication to their jobs became deadly when only four doctors in Madison County escaped the disease.

1925 – A campaign is begun by Dr. Carl Grote, Sr., to raise funds for a new hospital. In an outpouring of public sentiment, most of the money was raised by private donations. Property was donated by Harry Rhett, Sr.

1926 – A modern hospital, the first of its kind in the Tennessee Valley, is built. The name is officially changed from the Huntsville Infirmary to Huntsville Hospital. The first baby was delivered at Huntsville Hospital on June 11, 1926.

1932 – The Depression strikes home when the hospital is faced with the prospect of having to close its doors.

1943 – President Roosevelt approved $45,850 in federal funds to expand the hospital to 76 beds. The project also included the first emergency room and an X-ray department.

1955–57 – Expansion added new patient wings to the north and south ends of the 1926 building. An oxygen supply system was installed, and the entire facility was made more fireproof.

1961 – Huntsville Hospital was deeded over to the City of Huntsville in order to sell construction bonds to finance badly needed expansion.

1963 – Construction provided four floors of nursing units, bringing bed capacity to 320.

1964 – Hospital Auxiliary volunteers, known as "Pink Ladies", begin their service.

1967 – The state's first, on-site employee child care center opens at Huntsville Hospital.

1973 – Huntsville Hospital is selected as the teaching facility for UAH's School of Primary Medical Care. In addition, North Alabama's only Neonatal Nursery opens at Huntsville Hospital.

1979 – Construction of North Tower brings bed capacity to 578.

1981 – The region's first open-heart surgery is performed at Huntsville Hospital by Dr. Stancil Riley.

1982 – Huntsville Hospital reincorporated under the State Health Care Authority Act.

1985 – MedFlight service is established at the hospital.

1994 – Huntsville Hospital purchases Medical Center Hospital (Humana) from Columbia, becoming Huntsville Hospital East.

1995 – Huntsville Hospital celebrates its 100th anniversary.

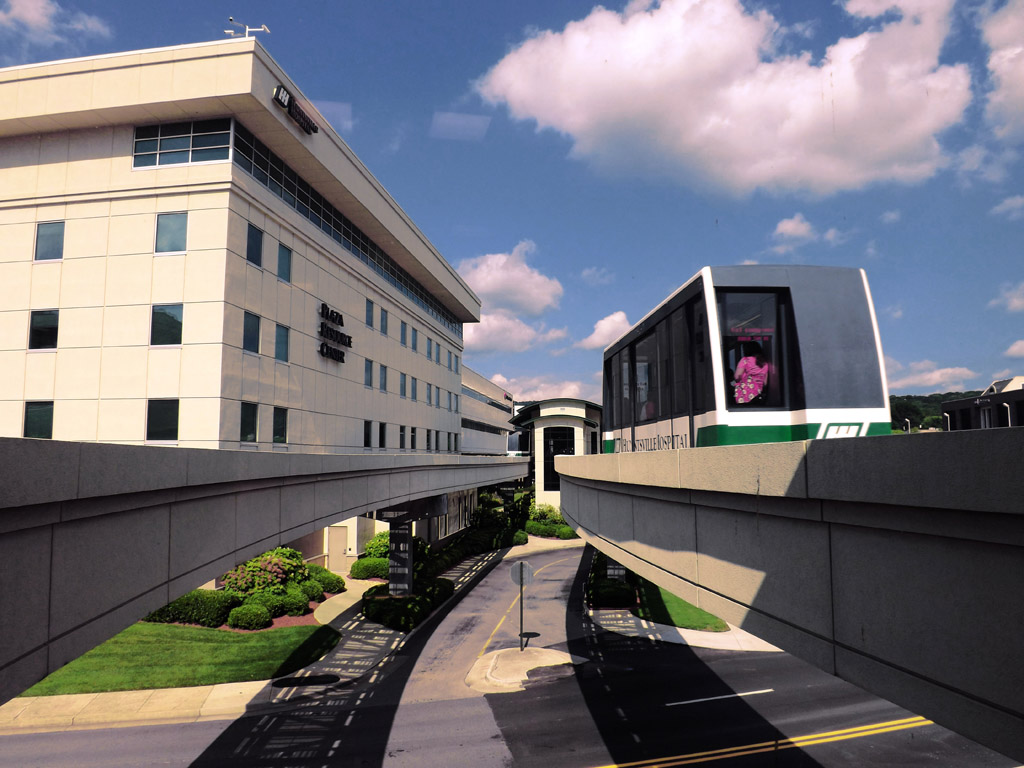
Huntsville Hospital tram system

2002 – Huntsville Hospital East becomes Huntsville Hospital for Women & Children. Huntsville Hospital completes construction of a two car overhead tram system connecting the main facilities on campus.

2005 – Construction begins on a new 84 bed patient room tower and an expanded Emergency Department.

2007 – Huntsville Hospital signs an affiliation contract with Athens-Limestone Hospital.

2009 – Huntsville Hospital is selected to build a hospital in nearby Madison, Alabama, the first new hospital in the state in 20 years; in addition, Huntsville Hospital acquires the Heart Center, P.C.

2012 – Huntsville Hospital enters into a 40-year lease partnership with Decatur General Hospital. Under the agreement, Huntsville Hospital-owned Parkway Medical Center in Decatur, Ala., and Decatur General will operate as one consolidated hospital under the name Decatur Morgan Hospital.

Madison Hospital opens in Madison, Alabama.

2014 – Huntsville Hospital enters into a 40-year lease partnership with Helen Keller Hospital in Sheffield, Colbert County, Alabama.

2018 – Huntsville Hospital enters affiliation contract with Marshall Medical Centers in Marshal County, Alabama, and Lincoln Health System in Lincoln County, Tennessee.

2019 – Construction begins on a 24-room OR and 72-inpatient bed tower.

2024 - Huntsville Hospital enters an agreement to purchase DeKalb Regional Medical Center and its related physicians clinics in Ft. Payne, Alabama.

2026 - Community Health Systems announced an agreement to sell Crestwood Medical Center in Huntsville, Alabama, to Huntsville Hospital Health System for $450 million. According to a release, the sale includes all assets of the 180-bed hospital and its associated outpatient centers and practices. The Crestwood Medical Center transaction is expected to close in the second quarter of 2026.

== Facilities ==
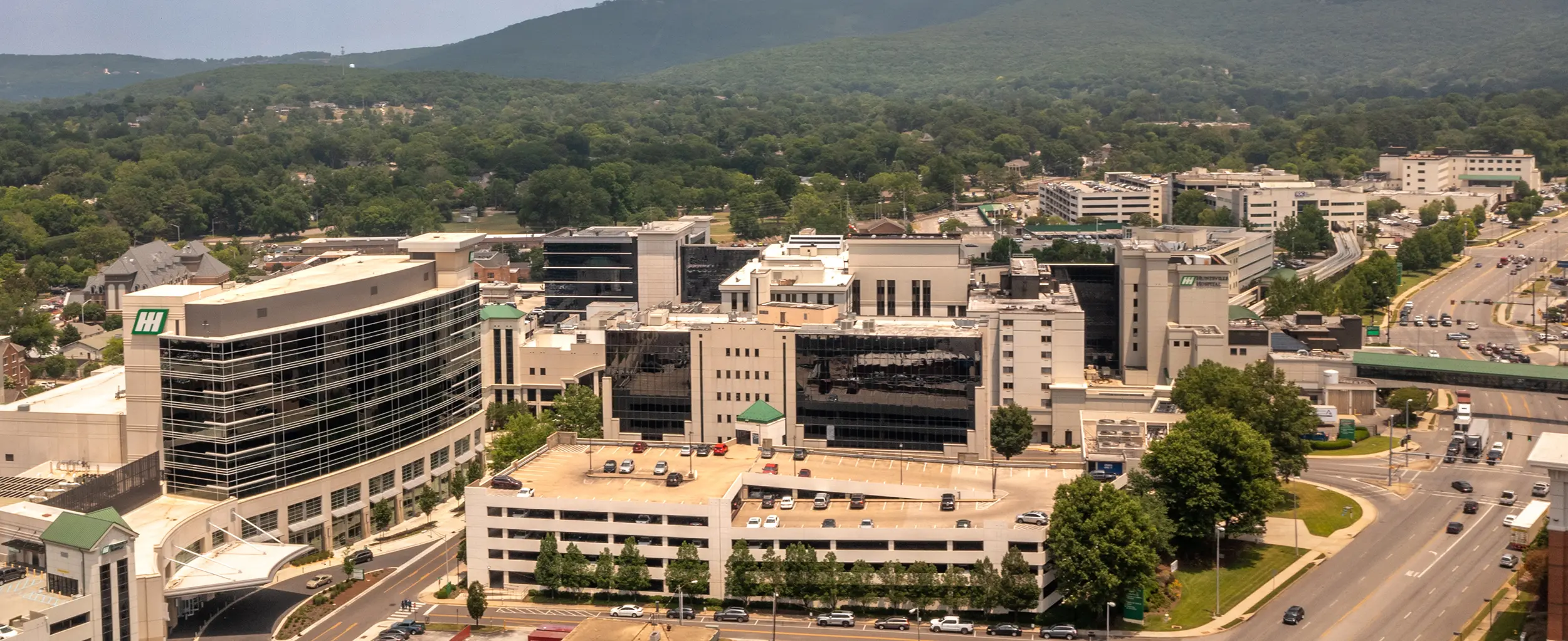
The Medical District of Huntsville, Alabama, consisting largely of Huntsville Hospital's main campus.

The Huntsville Hospital System is contained within a number of buildings in the Medical District; a tram connects the Huntsville Hospital Main, Franklin Medical Tower and Huntsville Hospital for Women & Children.

- Huntsville Hospital Main – the main facility
- Huntsville Hospital for Women & Children
- Huntsville Hospital Tram System
- Madison Street Tower – 84 private rooms for treatment of oncology, neuro-surgical, cardiology, and orthopedic surgery patients.
- Franklin Medical Tower- currently home to The Orthopedic Center, a private clinic of 27 doctors which includes specialties in all major body parts, pediatric, trauma, spine and sports medicine.
- Medical Mall – an outpatient facility located just west of the medical district.
- Madison Medical Park – a 25-acre (100,000 m^{2}) medical campus which includes physician offices, a "wellness center", and Madison Hospital.
- Blount Hospitality House – provides lodging for out-of-town relatives of patients in Huntsville area hospitals.
- Governors Medical Tower – this 20,000-square-foot (1,900 m^{2}) facility was designed to provide for patients undergoing same-day general surgeries.
- The Heart Center – offers prevention, diagnosis and treatment of diseases of the heart and blood vessels; also has offices in Madison, Decatur, Sheffield, Russellville and Boaz.

=== Affiliate Hospitals ===
Huntsville Hospital Health Systems is in various forms of partnerships with the following hospitals around the state of Alabama:

- Athens-Limestone Hospital- Hospital in Athens, Limestone County, Alabama
- Decatur Morgan Hospital- Hospital in Decatur, Morgan County, Alabama
- Lawrence Medical Center- Hospital in Moulton, Lawrence County, Alabama
- Helen Keller Hospital- Hospital in Sheffield, Colbert County, Alabama
- Highlands Medical Center - Hospital in Scottsboro, Jackson County, Alabama
- Marshall Medical Centers- Hospital in Marshall County, Alabama
- Lincoln Medical Center- Hospital in Fayetteville, Lincoln County, Tennessee
- Red Bay Hospital- Hospital in Red Bay, Franklin County, Alabama
