= Schmid Peoplemover =

Elevator capable of horizontal movement

The Schmid Peoplemover is an elevator capable of crossing an obstacle (a road, a railway, a river, etc.). It was invented by Emil Schmid and designed by the company Schmid-Maschinenbau from Sonnenbühl, Germany. Currently ThyssenKrupp Aufzugswerke GmbH is in charge of its maintenance.

A cabin with passengers, including wheelchair users, first moves vertically upwards, then horizontally, thus bridging an obstacle, and finally vertically down. Vertical and horizontal trips are connected by a wide, smooth arc. The company claims that its construction is significantly cheaper than an overpass or underpass, occupies less space and it may be installed in 2–3 days from parts fabricated according to different specifications as to height, span, and visual design style.

The first Schmid peoplemover installed in 2001 in Pfullingen (across route B 313). The Pfullingen Peoplemover stopped operating in 2009 due to economic reasons. In 2003 the Ursulabergtunnel opened in Pfullingen, the road no longer was used as a long-distance route of high traffic and subsequently downgraded. Traffic lights replaced the people mover.

Two Schmid peoplemovers exist since 2006 in Altbach in the district of Esslingen and since 2007 at the Berlin-Rummelsburg Betriebsbahnhof station in Berlin and are used to cross railways and grant accessibility to the platform.

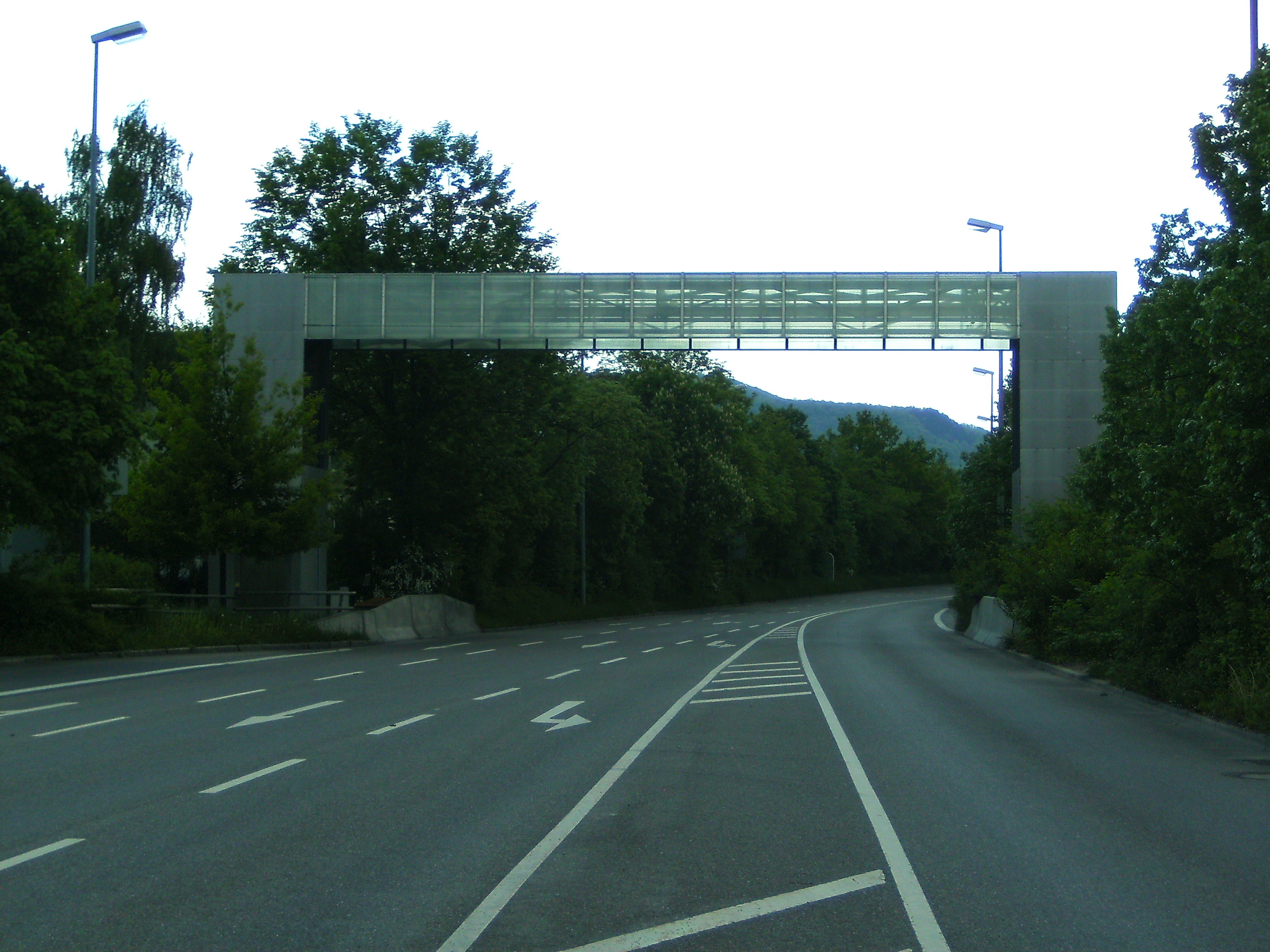
Peoplemover in Pfullingen

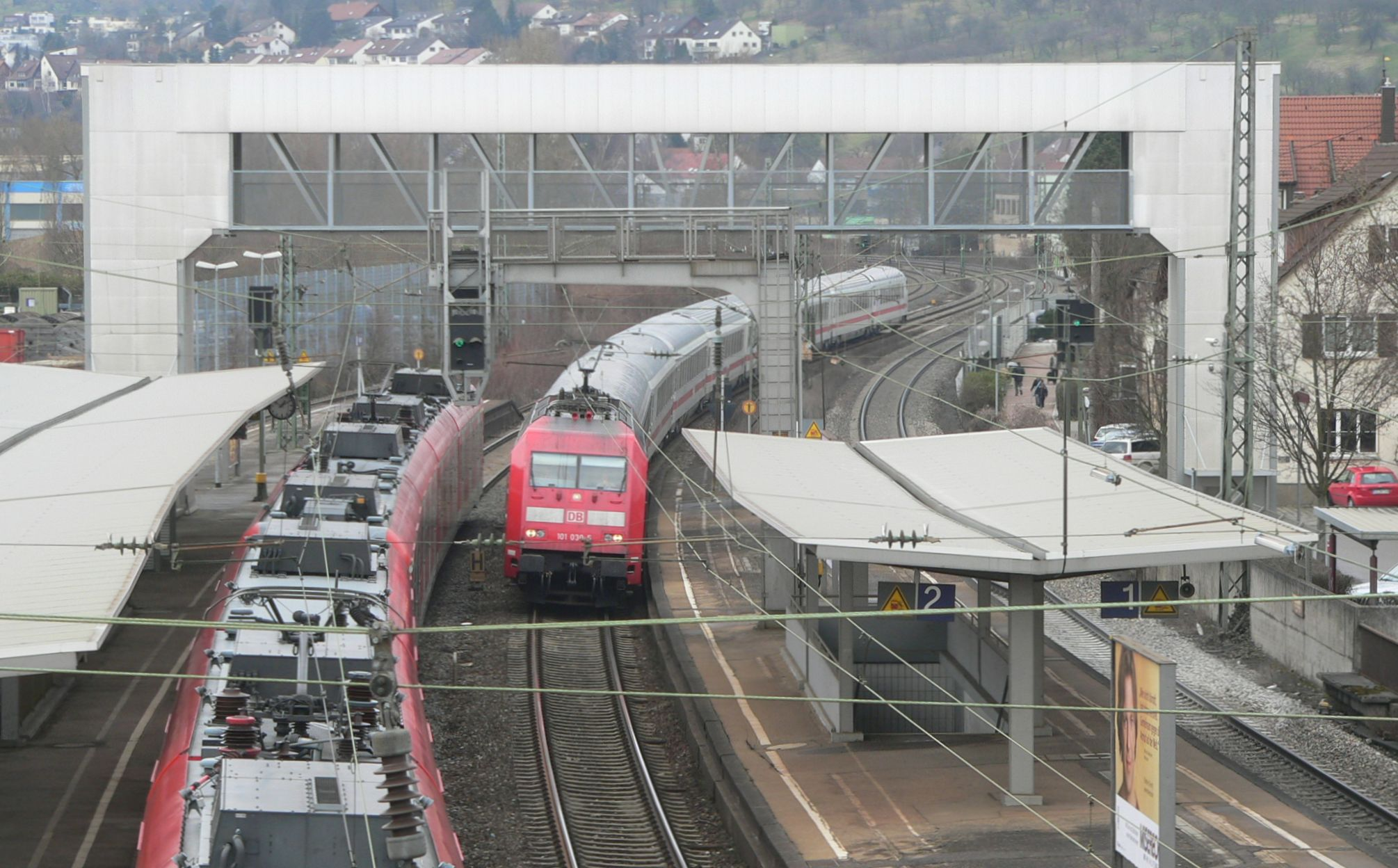
Peoplemover in Altbach

Schmid Peoplemover in Altbach moving over the railway station (video)

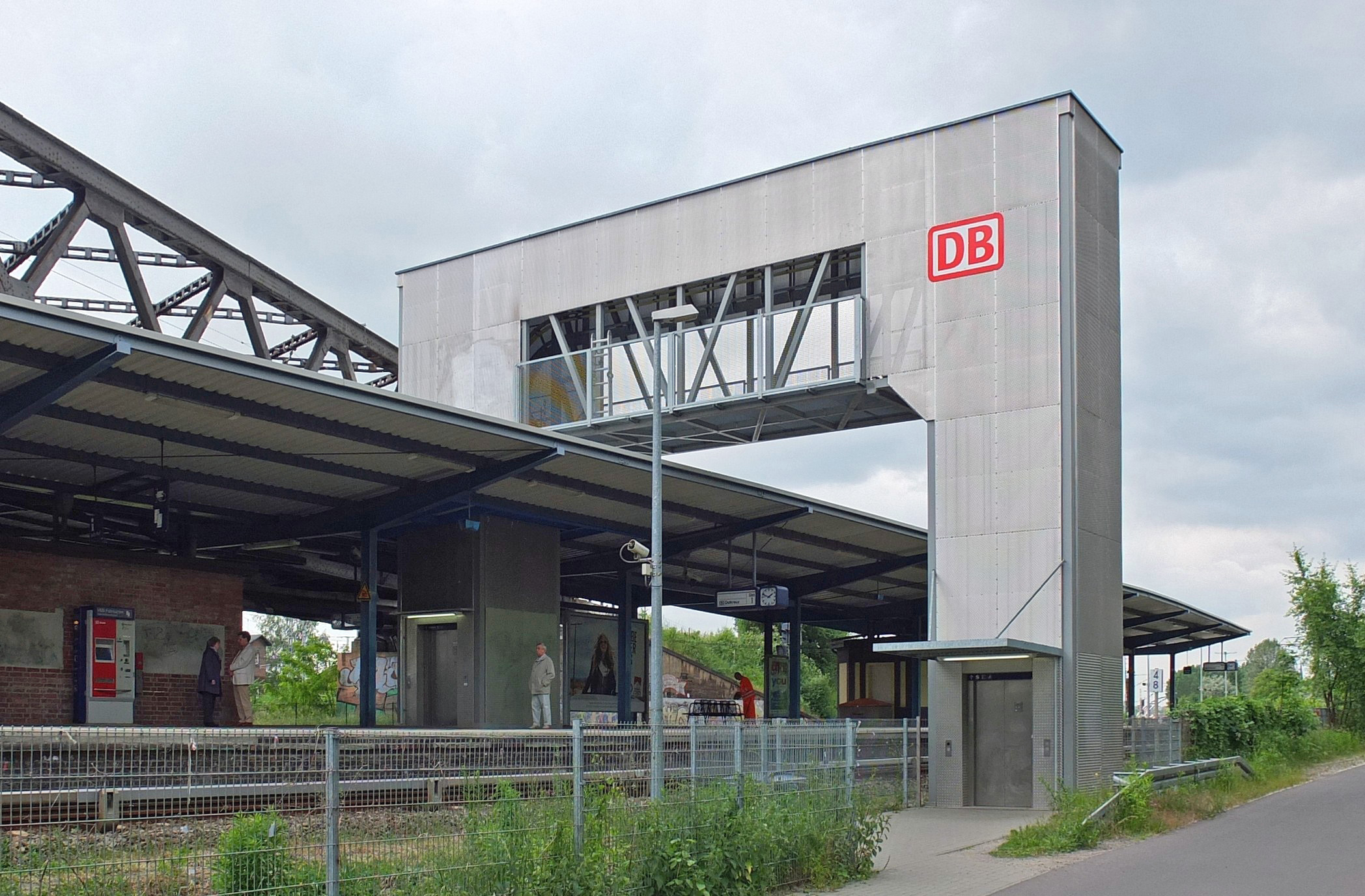
Peoplemover at the Bbf-Rummelsburg

== See also ==
- Elevator
- Moving walkway
- People mover
