= Wolmido =

Island near Incheon, South Korea

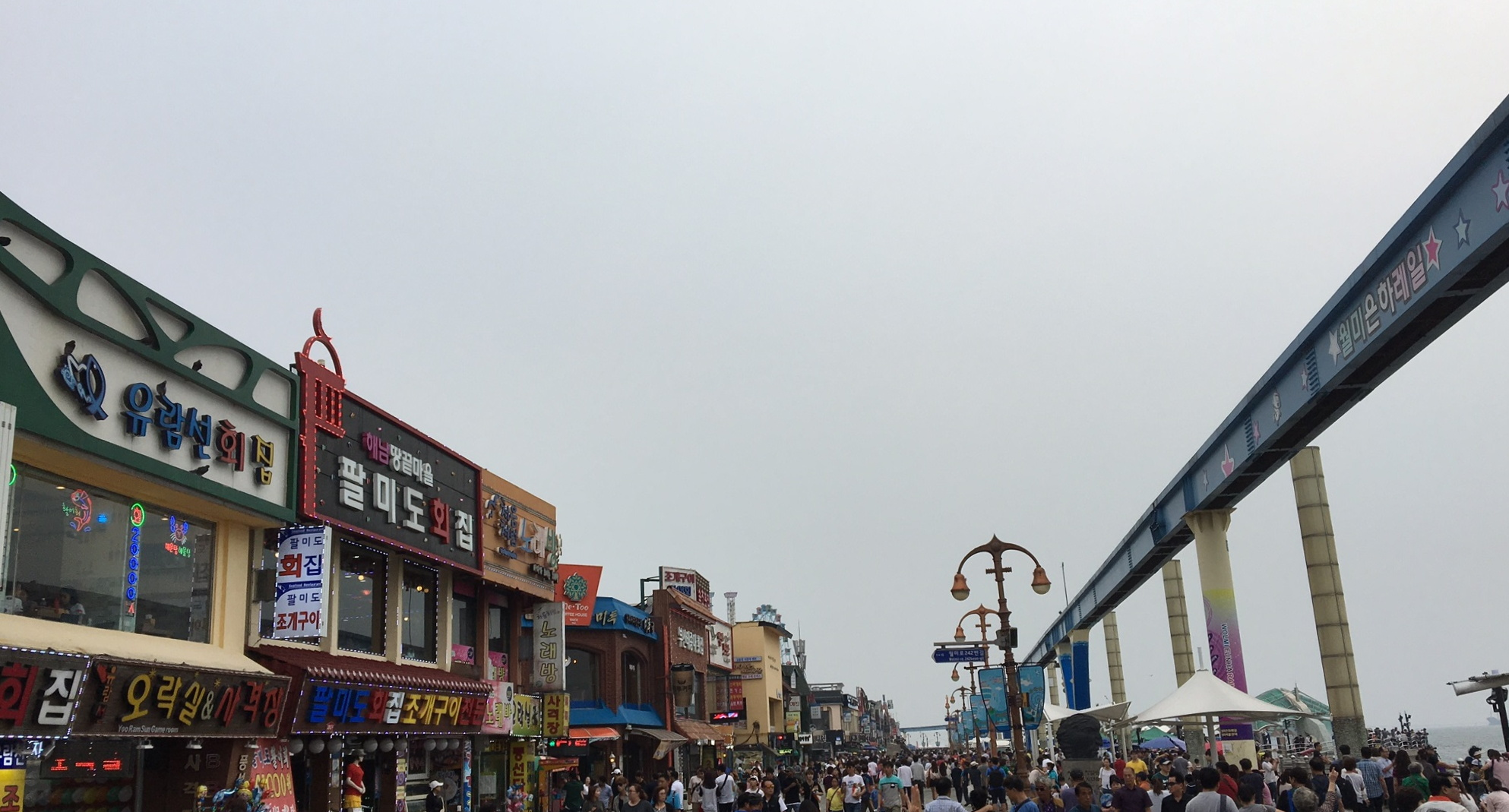
- Interactive map of Wolmido

Geography
- Coordinates: 37°28′20″N 126°36′08″E

Korean name
- Hangul: 월미도
- Hanja: 月尾島
- RR: Wolmido
- MR: Wŏlmido

Wolmido (Korean: 월미도) is an island 1 kilometer (0.62 mi) off the coast of Incheon, South Korea. It was connected to the mainland by a highway in 1989, and was later connected by a monorail which opened in late 2019. It is a weekend destination and tourist area, with restaurants, the theme park Play Hill and the areas Meeting Square, Arts Square, Performance Square, and Good Harvest Square.

The Korean Traditional Garden at Wolmi Park (월미공원) was established in 2001 after the relocation of the Army base which had been located there for 50 years.

== History ==
On September 13, 1950, a naval gunfire support group composed of two US heavy cruisers, two British light cruisers, and six US destroyers began two days of neutralizing the North Korean People's Army (NKPA) artillery batteries on Wolmido Island, where NKPA troops were stationed, in preparation for the Incheon Landings. On September 15, 1950, South Korean and United Nations troops, commanded by U.S. Gen. Douglas MacArthur, landed on Wolmido Island and retook Incheon before pushing onto Seoul. The landing turned the tides after the South Korean and UN forces had been pushed back to Busan early in the Korean War. Several hundred civilians were killed in the dropping of 93 napalm bombs. The battle was inspiration for the North Korean war film Wolmi Island produced in 1982.

An Army base was established at the site of what became Wolmi Park (월미공원) after the base's relocation. The site was turned into a garden and opened to the public in 2001.
