= Skylink (Dallas Fort Worth International Airport) =

Automated people mover at Dallas Fort Worth International Airport

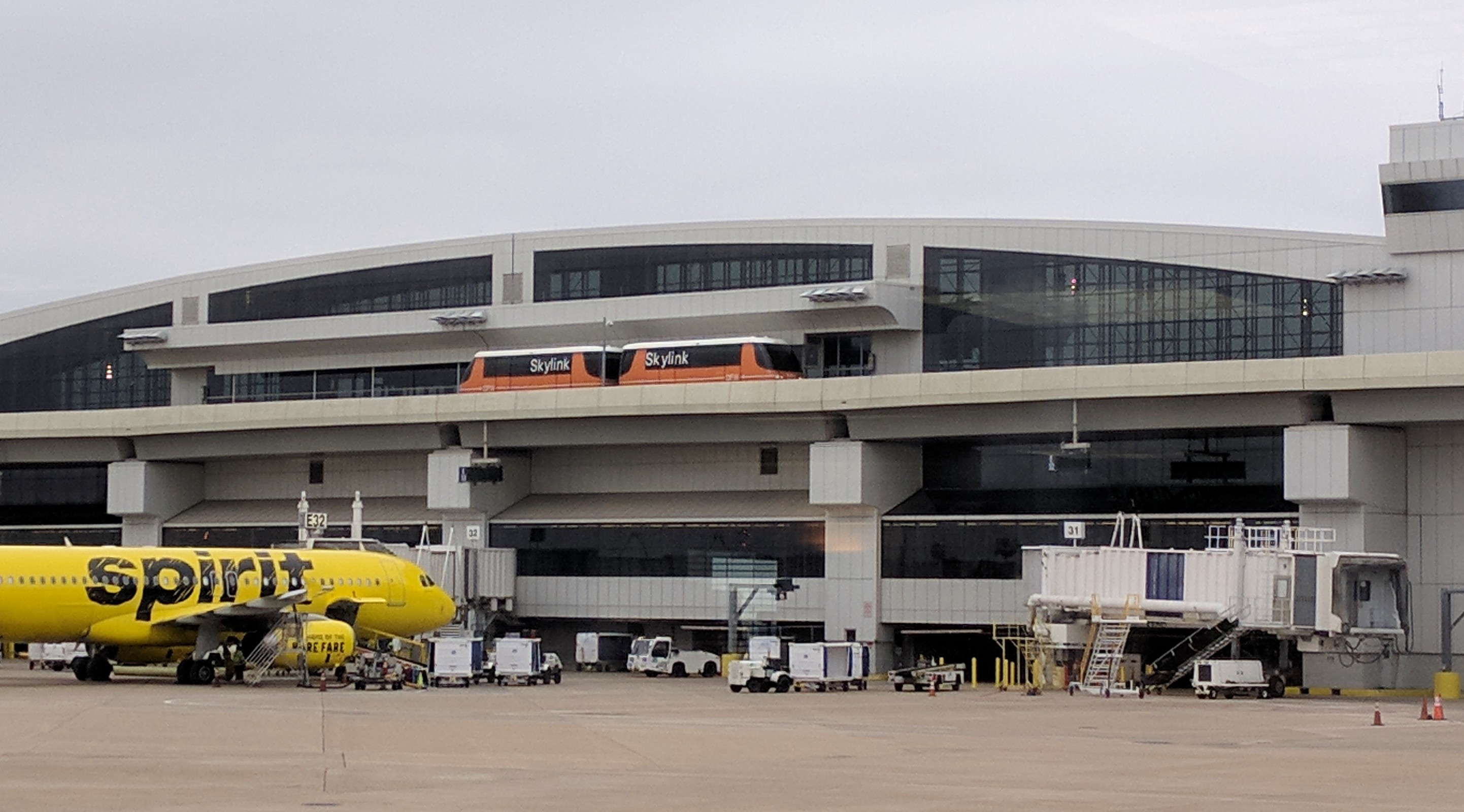
- Skylink stopped at a Terminal E station

Overview
- Status: Operational
- Owner: DFW Airport Board
- Locale: Dallas Fort Worth International Airport
- Stations: 10 (+1 Under Construction)

Service
- Type: Automated people mover
- Operator: Alstom
- Rolling stock: Innovia APM 200
- Ridership: 5,000 passengers per direction per hour

History
- Opened: May 21, 2005; 21 years ago

Technical
- Line length: 4.81 mi (7.74 km)
- Number of tracks: 2
- Character: Elevated
- Electrification: Third rail, 750 V DC
- Operating speed: 37 mph (60 km/h)
Route map
Skylink highlighted in orange

Skylink is an automated people mover (APM) system operating at Dallas Fort Worth International Airport (DFW). The bi-directional system connects the airsides of the airport's five terminals.

Skylink contains 10 stations (2 per terminal) and 4.81 miles (7.74 km) of elevated track. It utilizes Innovia APM 200 vehicles and is operated by the vehicles' manufacturer, Alstom, under contract with DFW.

The system was opened in 2005 as a replacement for DFW's original APM system, the Vought Airtrans. At opening, it was the world's longest airside airport train system (AirTrain JFK is longer but operates landside).

== History ==
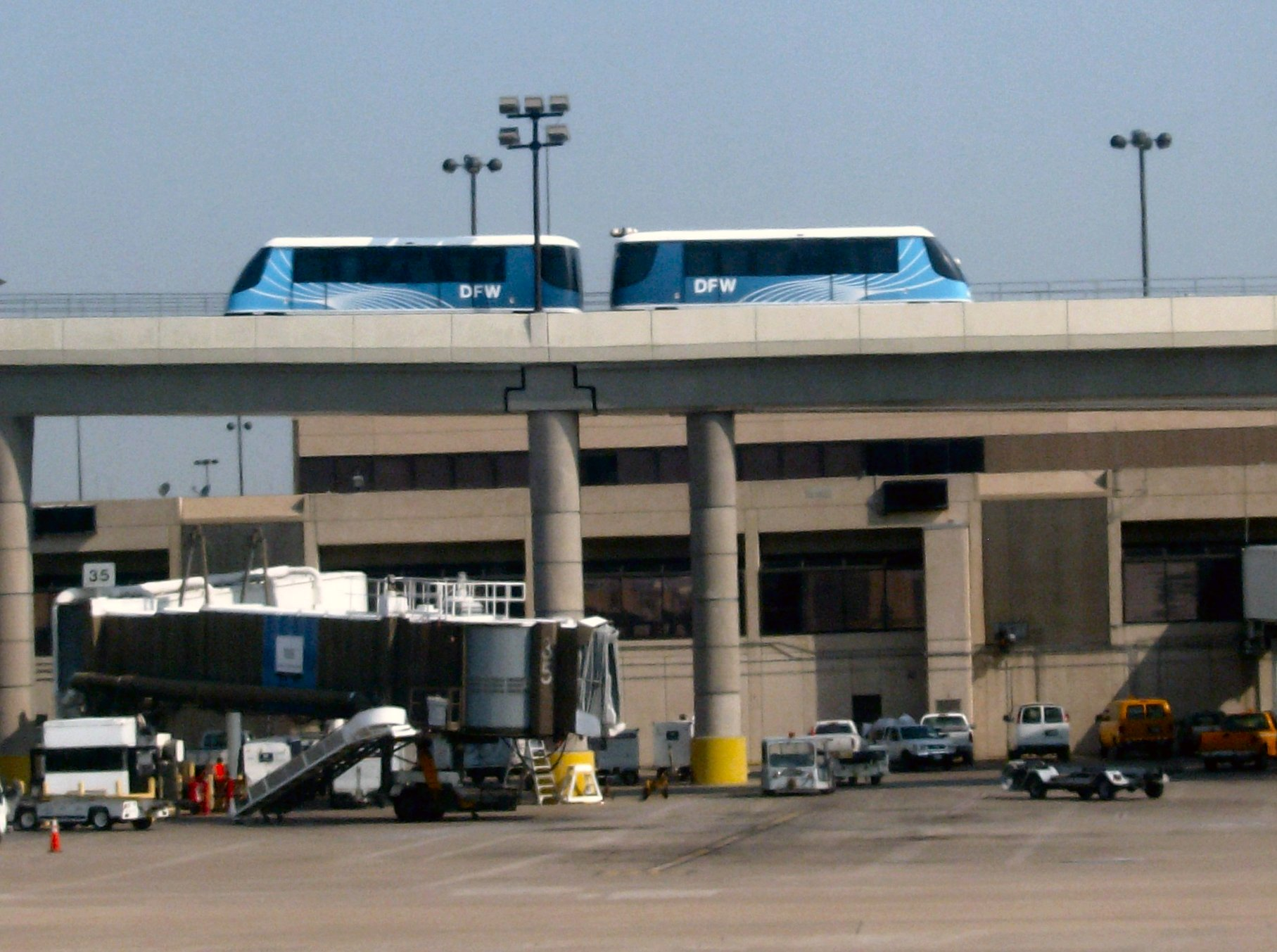
Skylink operating in 2008 in the older blue livery before the airport's 2015 refresh to orange.

Skylink was developed as a replacement for the Vought Airtrans (part of which was later operated as American Airlines' TrAAin System), the airport's original people mover system that connected airport facilities and parking lots. It served the airport for 31 years from 1974 to 2005 and transported a quarter of a billion passengers between DFW's then four terminals and employee facilities, logging a total of 97 million miles (156 million kilometres) over the lifetime of its fleet. As DFW became a large connecting hub for flights, Airtrans was noted for being slow with its top speed of 17 mph (27 km/h) and following a uni-directional counter-clockwise loop located inside security for Terminals A, B, and C and outside security to other areas, was inefficient in moving passengers. The system was decommissioned soon after Skylink opened as a modern replacement but the old guideways were left in place throughout the airport.

Skylink guideway construction began in the fall of 1999 and took place with limited interruption of aircraft traffic. Contractors worked during overnight hours for three years – when airline gates were unused – arriving on site, completing work and removing equipment each morning before returning gates to an airline.

The Skylink system made its public debut on June 25, 2004, where it then began a rigorous testing period. It was opened to the public on May 21, 2005, and is completely automated. Skylink trains run every two minutes and travel at speeds up to 35–37 mph (56–60 km/h).

In 2015, after a decade of service, Skylink had transported over 141 million people and traveled over 32.4 million fleet miles (52.1 million kilometres).

== Operations ==
The Skylink system operates airside at DFW, mostly serving passengers connecting between flights, and is inaccessible to those who have not cleared security.

Skylink operates trains 24 hours a day, 365 days a year. The system is double-tracked and both tracks are operational between 5 am and midnight. Between midnight and 5 am, one track may be taken out of operation to allow for maintenance. The system has crossovers between the Terminal D stations and the Terminal E stations. There are also pocket tracks in the sections of the guideway that cross International Parkway.

The longest trip between farthest stations is 9 minutes with an average 5 minute journey. This allows most passengers to make a connection from any one flight to another in around seven minutes, not including walking time to and from the stations. The train supports a minimum airline connection time of 30 minutes.

The Skylink system uses a total of 64 Innovia APM 200 vehicles, coupled together into two car trains. Each Skylink vehicle can accommodate up to 69 passengers and their carry-on luggage. The Innovia APM 200 technology is also used at London Heathrow Airport's Terminal 5 as well as the PHX Sky Train.

The audio announcements on SkyLink are provided by local voice-over artist Doc Morgan.

== Structure ==
The concrete and steel guideway for Skylink, elevated at an average of 50 feet (15 m), was constructed above the terminals on 375 columns in a 4.81-mile-long (7.74 km) bi-directional loop. The inner track travels clockwise and the outer track travels counter-clockwise.

Each of the five terminals contains two stations which are accessed on the secure (air) side. Unlike the previous Vought Airtrans APM system, Skylink only connects terminals and does not travel to the airport's parking lots or rental car facility. The stations contain four sets of doors on each platform for entrance and exiting of passengers. Two more stations can be constructed for a future Terminal F if it is built.

== Gallery ==
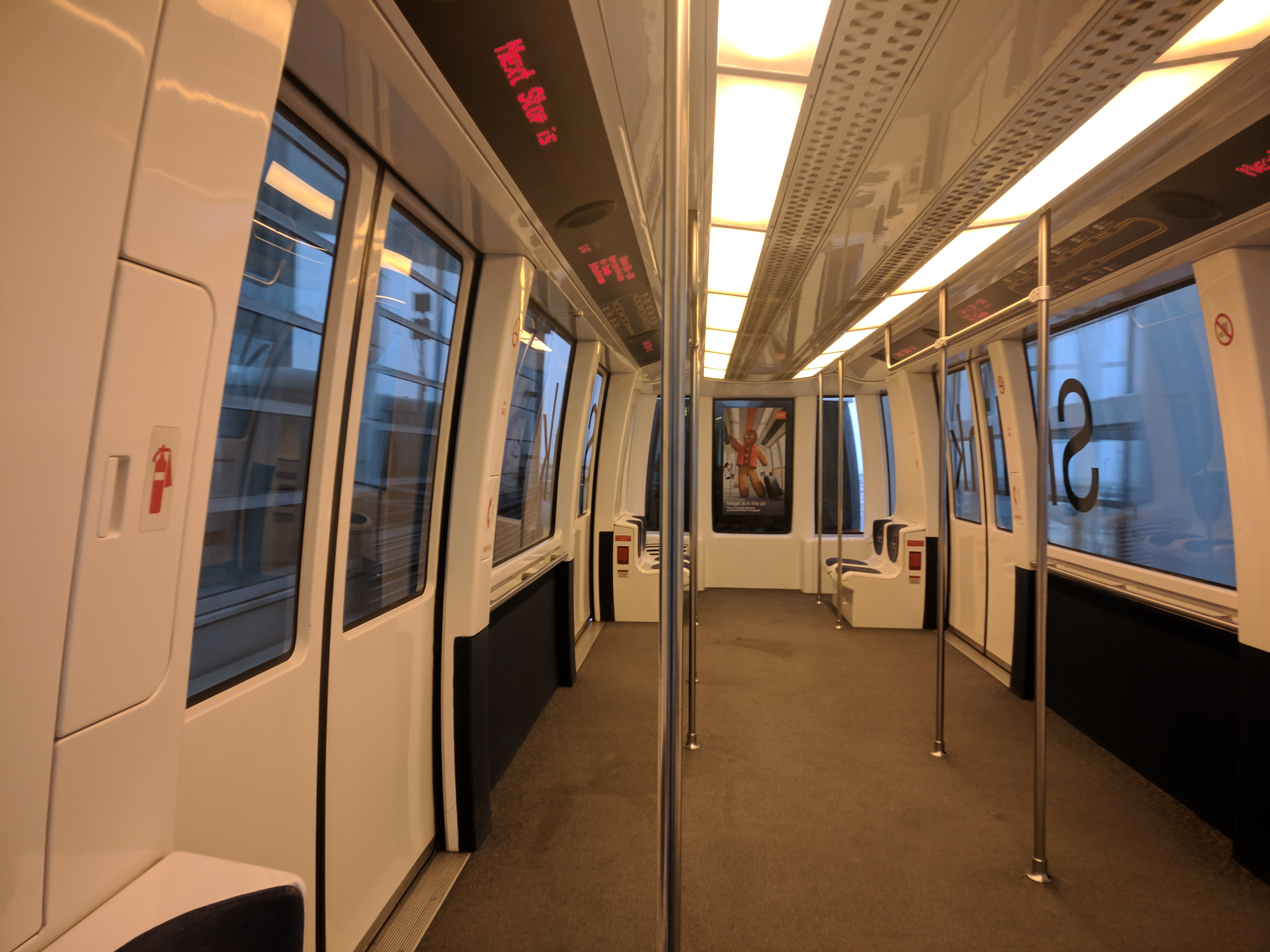
Interior of a Skylink car

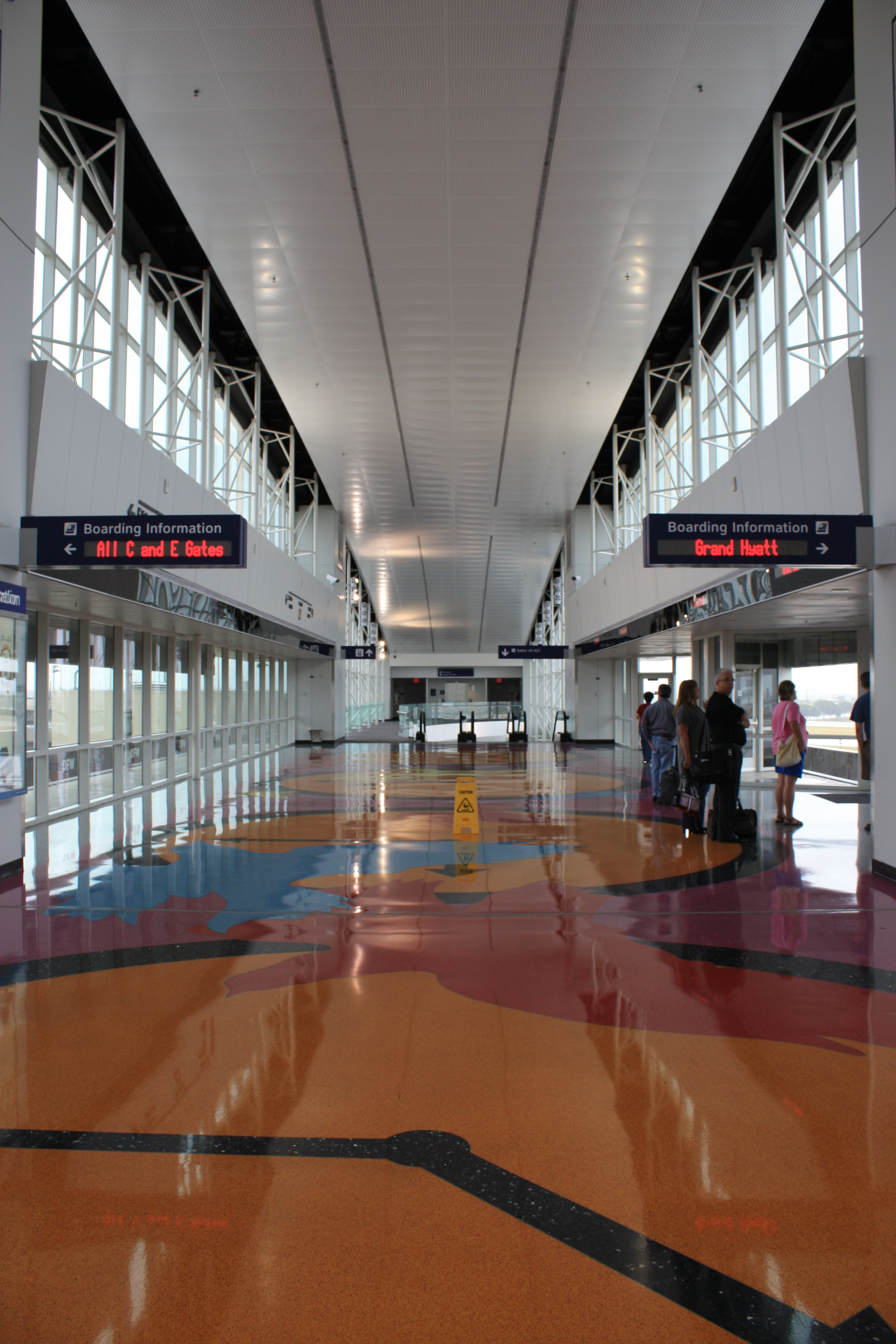
A Skylink station inside Terminal A

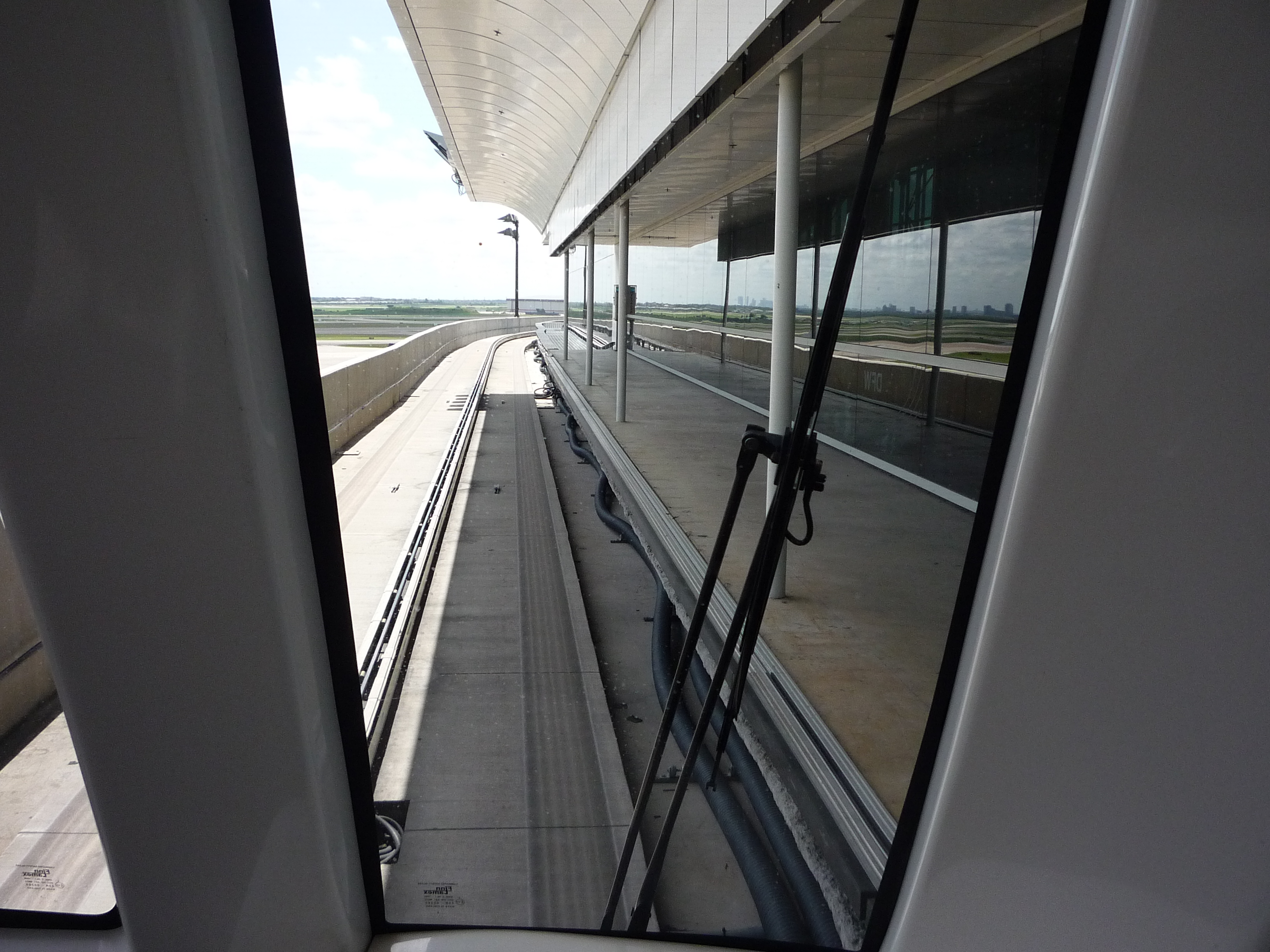
Skylink pulling into station (Platform shown is for emergencies only; passengers normally exit through sliding doors directly into terminal.)

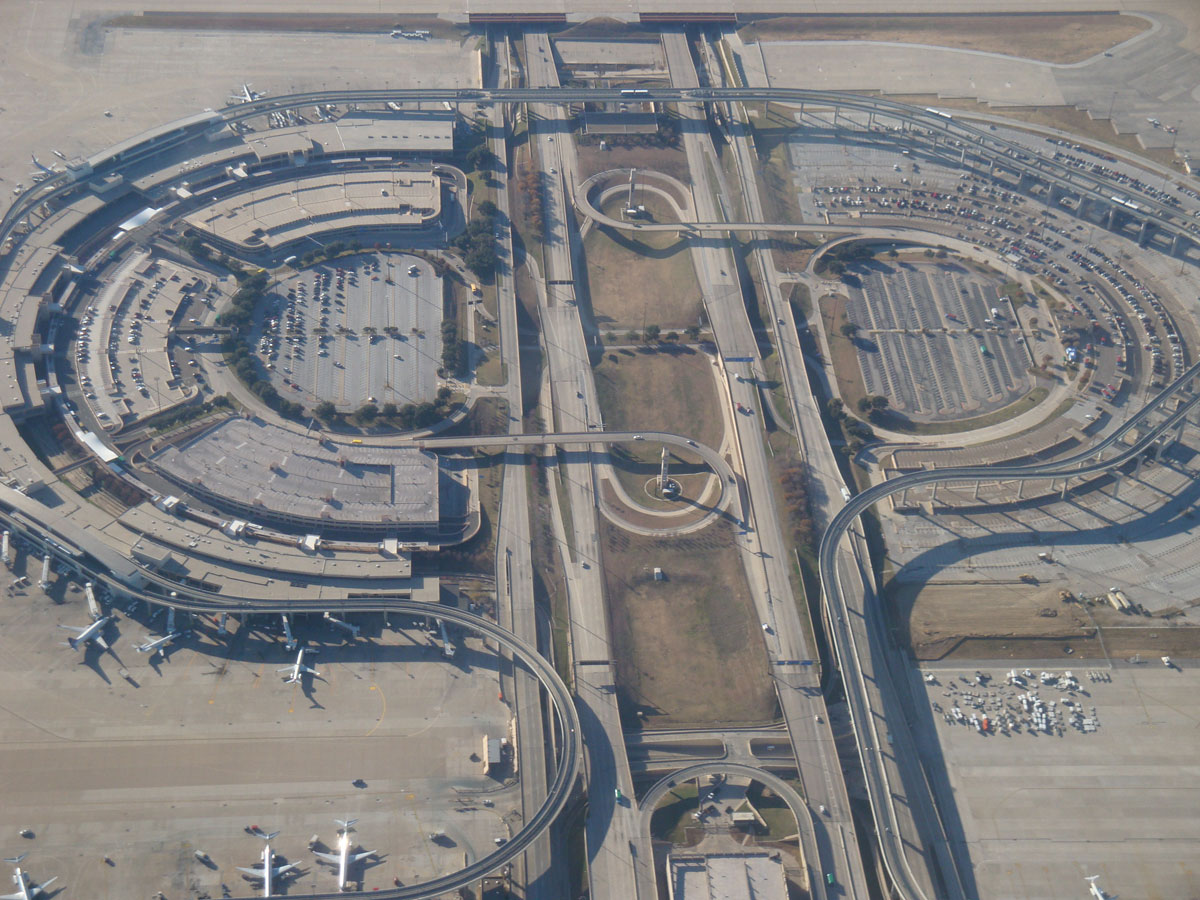
Skylink guideway above Terminal E (left) and Express South Parking Lot/future site of Terminal F (right)
