= PHX Sky Train =

Electric people mover at Phoenix Sky Harbor International Airport

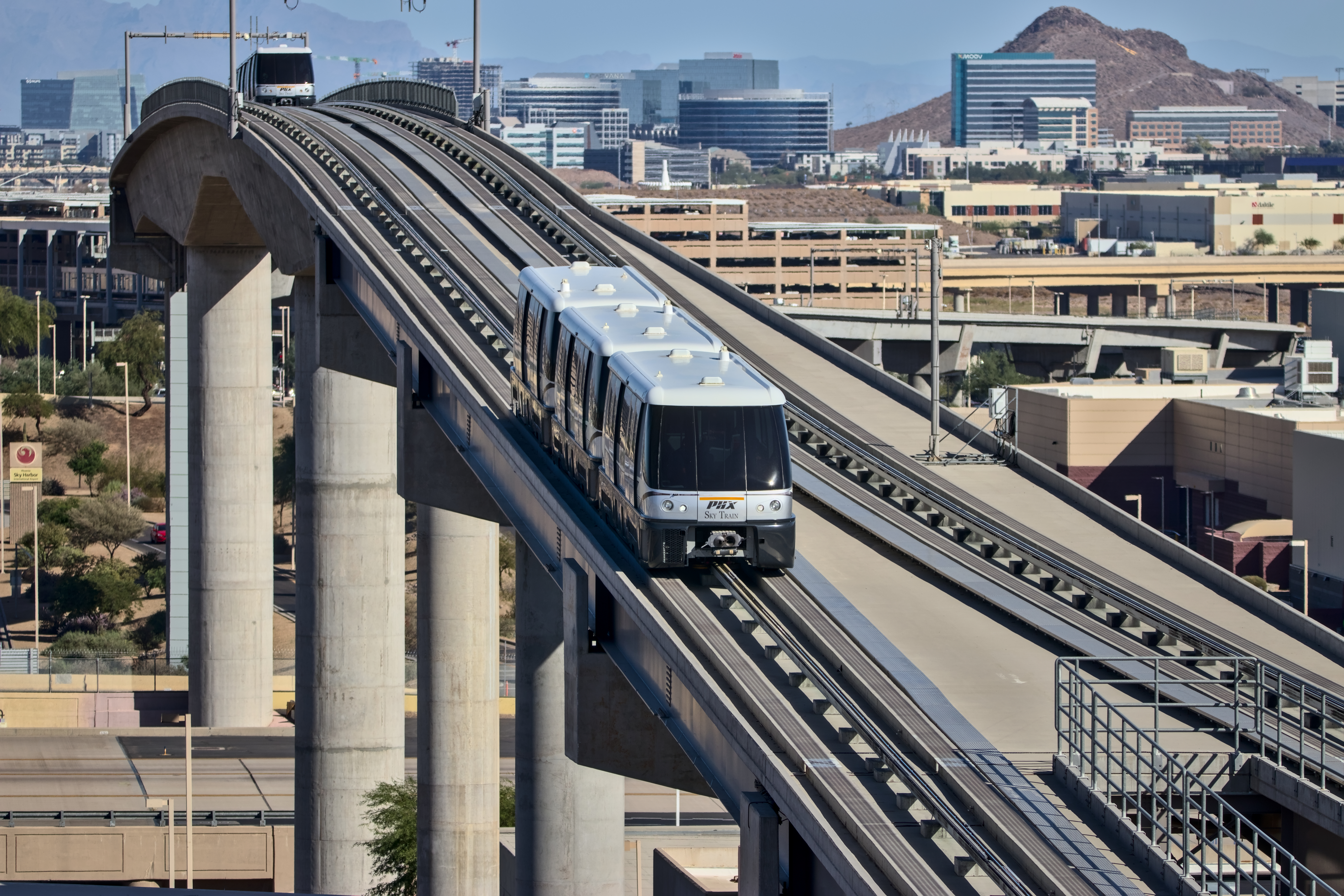
- PHX Sky Train

Overview
- Owner: City of Phoenix Aviation Department
- Locale: Phoenix Sky Harbor International Airport, Phoenix, Arizona
- Termini: Rental Car Center; 44th Street/Washington
- Stations: 6

Service
- Type: People mover
- Operator: Alstom
- Rolling stock: 42 × Innovia APM 200

History
- Opened: April 8, 2013 (Phase 1); December 8, 2014 (Phase 1A); December 20, 2022 (Phase 2)

Technical
- Line length: 5 mi (8.0 km)
- Character: Elevated
- Highest elevation: 100 feet (30 m)
Route map
PHX Sky Train highlighted in grey

The PHX Sky Train is an electric people mover at Phoenix Sky Harbor International Airport in Phoenix, Arizona. The initial segment opened to the public on April 8, 2013. The first extension to Terminal 3 opened on December 8, 2014, and the second extension to the Rental Car Center opened on December 20, 2022. The 24/7 service operates free of charge, with trains running every 3–5 minutes.

The PHX Sky Train replaced shuttle buses for transit within the airport property. Inter-terminal shuttle bus service was discontinued on January 15, 2015. Rental Car Center shuttle buses ended with the opening of the extension in 2022.

The PHX Sky Train features a 100-foot-tall (30 m) bridge over Taxiway R, one of three taxiways that connects the north and south runways. This is the first transit bridge in the world to be built over an active taxiway. The bridge is tall enough to allow for Boeing 747 and Airbus A380 aircraft to pass under.

== History ==
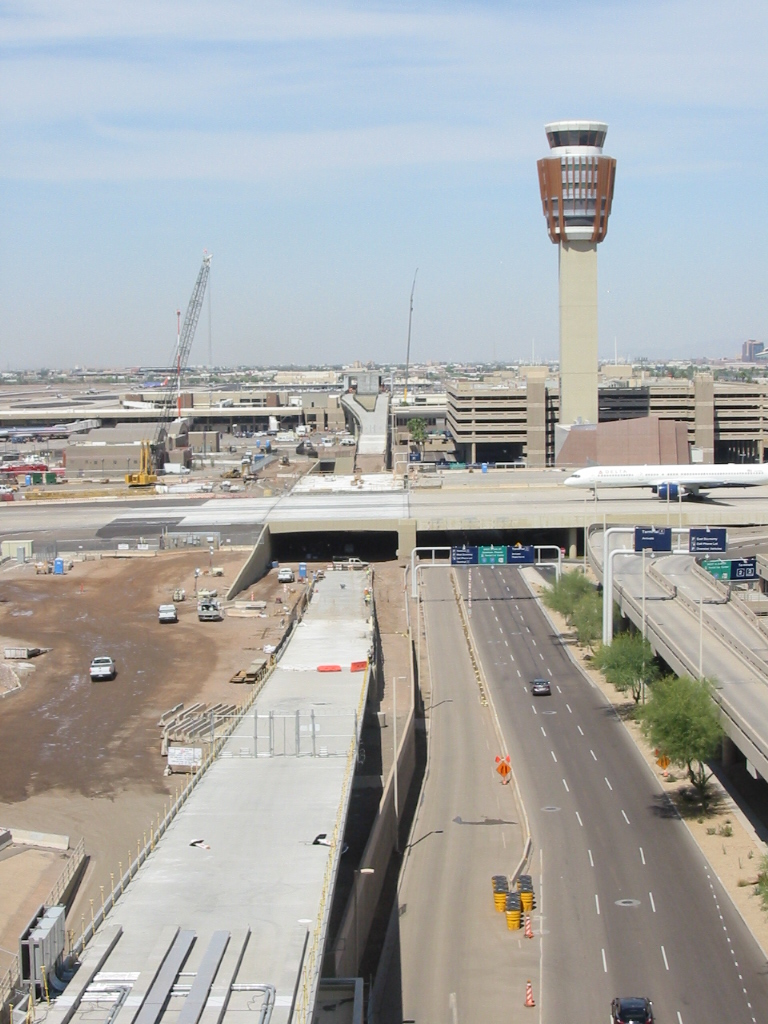
Phase 1a construction as of May 2013, viewed from Terminal 4 to T3. The concrete guideway, largely complete, dives under Taxiways S and T, then rises to enter the skeleton of the T3 station

Phase 1 consists of a 1.7 miles (2.7 km) segment constructed between December 2008 and April 2013. It links Terminal 4, the East Economy Parking lot, and the 44th Street/Washington station on the A Line of the Valley Metro Rail & Streetcar system. The guideway runs in a new underpass (below the Union Pacific railroad), past the jet-fuel tank farm, and alongside 44th Street. At an estimated cost of $1.58 billion, Phase 1 opened on April 8, 2013.

Phase 1a, which opened December 8, 2014, extended the train from Terminal 4 to Terminal 3. A 0.25-mile (0.40 km) covered walkway connected the Terminal 3 station with Terminal 2 until Terminal 2 closed in February 2020.

Phase 2 opened on December 20, 2022, and extended the Sky Train west from Terminal 3 to the Rental Car Center. Funding was approved in October 2016 and the extension was projected to cost $700 million. Phase 2 construction completed in mid 2022 and was under testing until its final opening in December. Phase 2 was fully funded by airline and rental car passenger fees. The 2.5 miles (4.0 km) extension passes in two cuts underneath future taxiways and Interstate 10.

=== Future ===
Phase 2 includes provisions for infill stations to be constructed for a future "West Terminal" (on the site of the West Economy Parking lots) as well as a new ground transportation center to be built just east of 24th Street. Both the new terminal and new ground transportation center are unfunded and included in the airport's 20-year Comprehensive Asset Management Plan.

== Passenger services ==
At the 44th Street station, domestic passengers could check baggage for flights operated by American Airlines, Southwest Airlines, and United Airlines, though this ended in November 2017. Once checked, the baggage was delivered in locked containers to the internal baggage-handling systems at Terminal 4. Delivery of the baggage was via secured shuttle-trucks that ran approximately every eight minutes.

44th Street also has a passenger drop-off area, cell phone lot, bike racks, and bike lockers. It is also served by routes 1, 32, and 44 of the Valley Metro Bus system. FlixBus boards from the north side of the Sky Train station.

Select airlines also offer kiosks to print boarding passes at the 44th Street/Washington and East Economy Parking stations.

== Ridership ==
Three months after opening, the PHX Sky Train carried about 70,000 people per week, over 40% higher than the design estimates of about 48,000. The busiest days are Thursday and Friday. The busiest times are 5 am-8 am and noon-3 pm In March 2016, average daily ridership was 15,940.

Cumulative ridership hit 1 million in 2013 and hit 10 million in 2015.

== Rolling stock ==
Rolling stock consists of 18 Innovia APM 200 vehicles. Trains generally operating as six 3-car trainsets, although 2-car trainsets are in use during off-peak times. With the opening of Phase 2, Bombardier will deliver 24 additional vehicles.

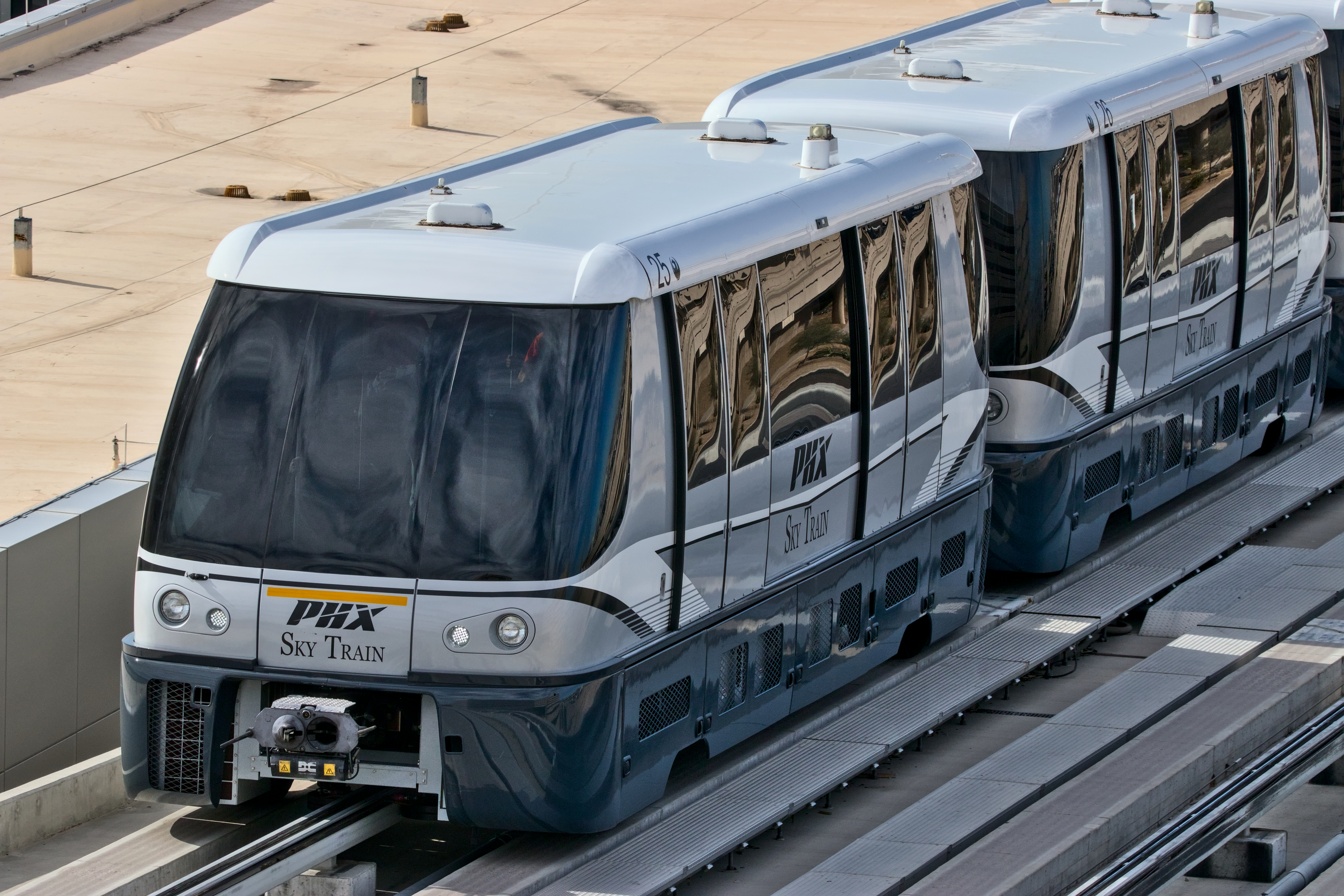
PHX Sky Train cars 25, 26, and 27 operating as a 3-car trainset

The system is designed to carry 3,300 passengers per hour per direction. The average speed of the trains was forecasted to be 23 miles per hour (37 km/h), with trainsets capable of reaching 38 miles per hour (61 km/h), making the journey time from the 44th Street to Terminal 4 five minutes, plus an additional two minutes to reach Terminal 3.

This is the third Innovia APM 200 installation following the DFW Skylink and Heathrow Terminal 5 Transit.

== Gallery ==
Different views of the PHX Sky Train and terminal.

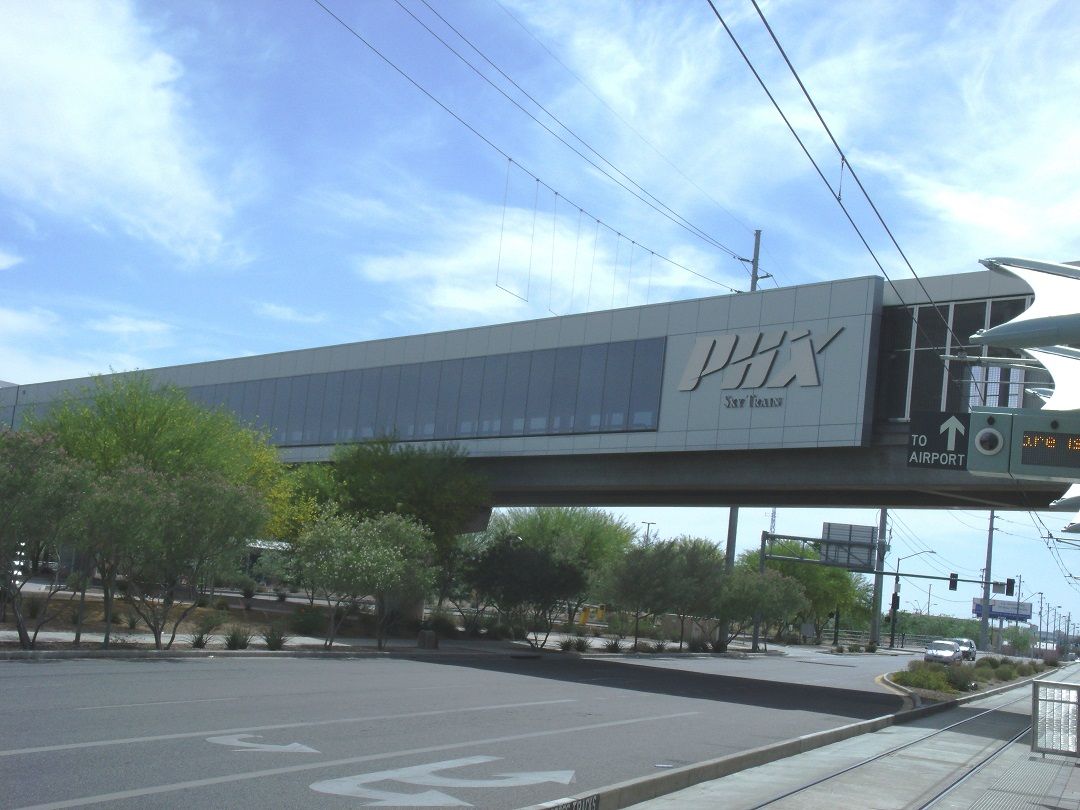
Outside view of the main terminal of the PHX Sky Train.

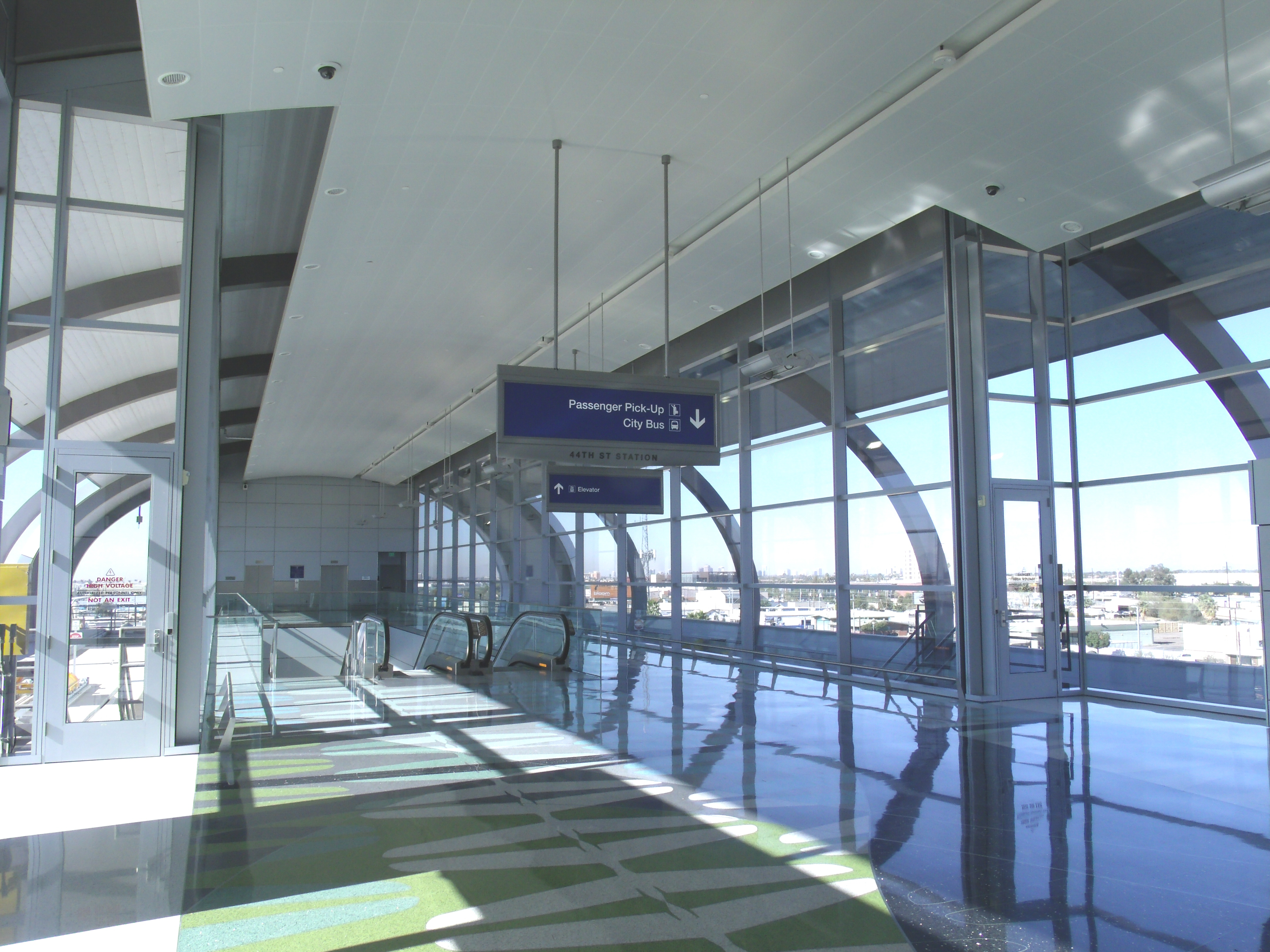
Inside the PHX Sky Train 44th Street Terminal Station.

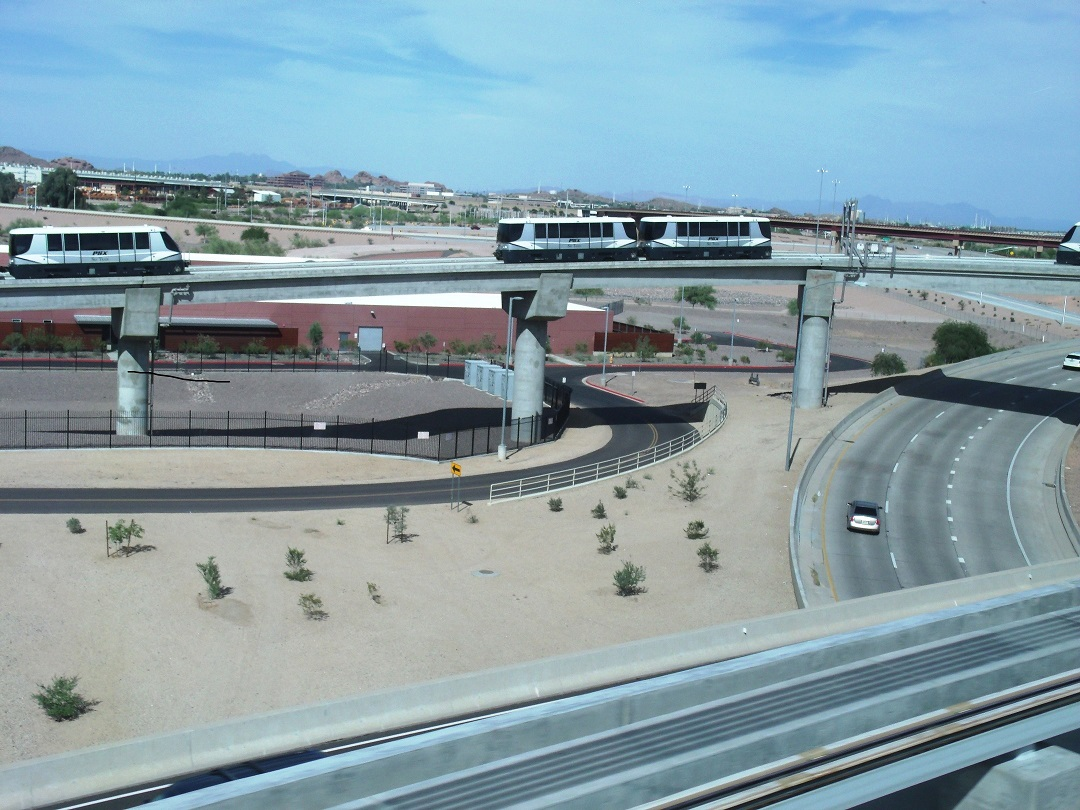
View of the other PHX Sky Trains.

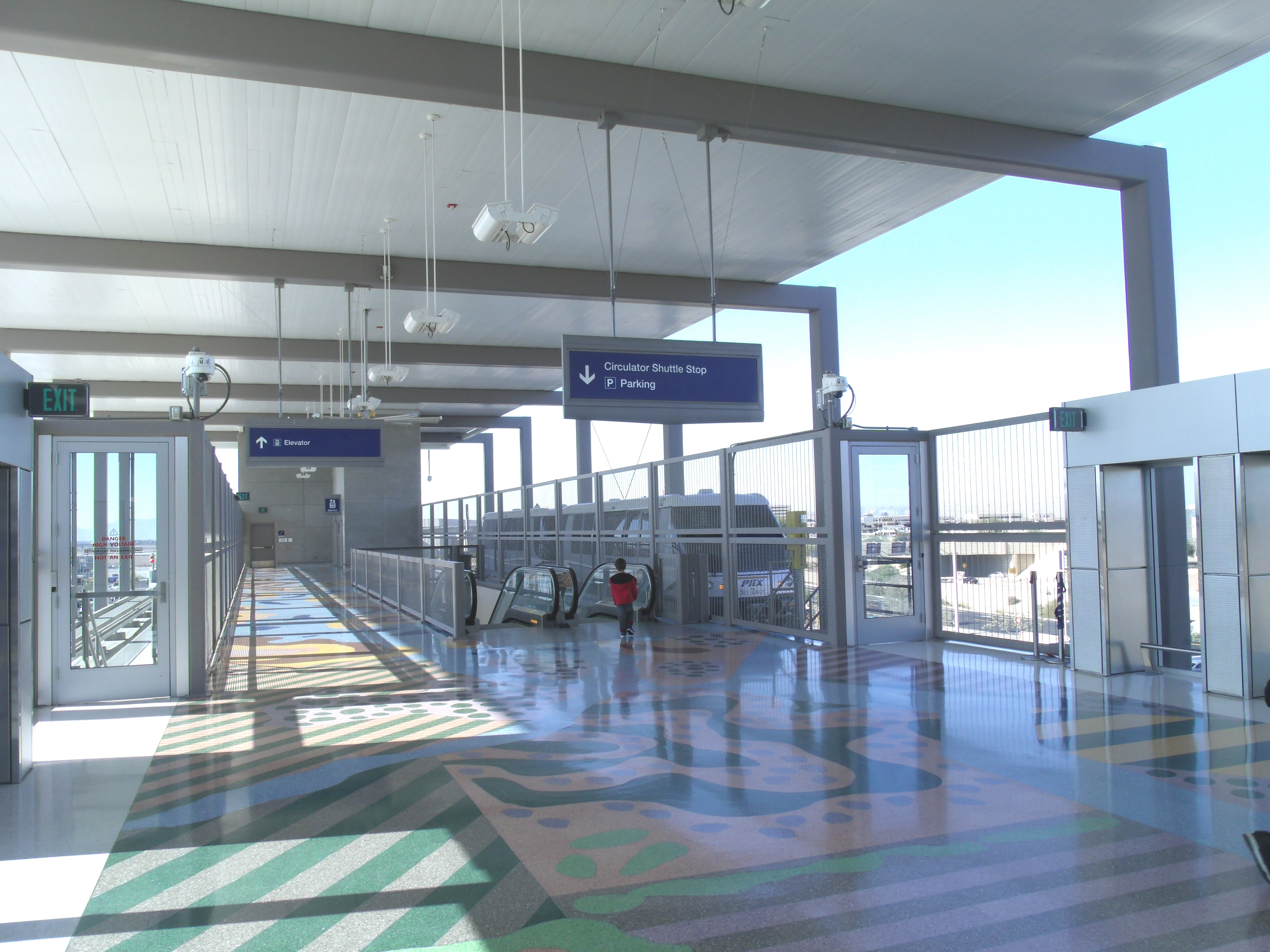
Inside the PHX Sky Train Circulator Shuttle Stop Station.

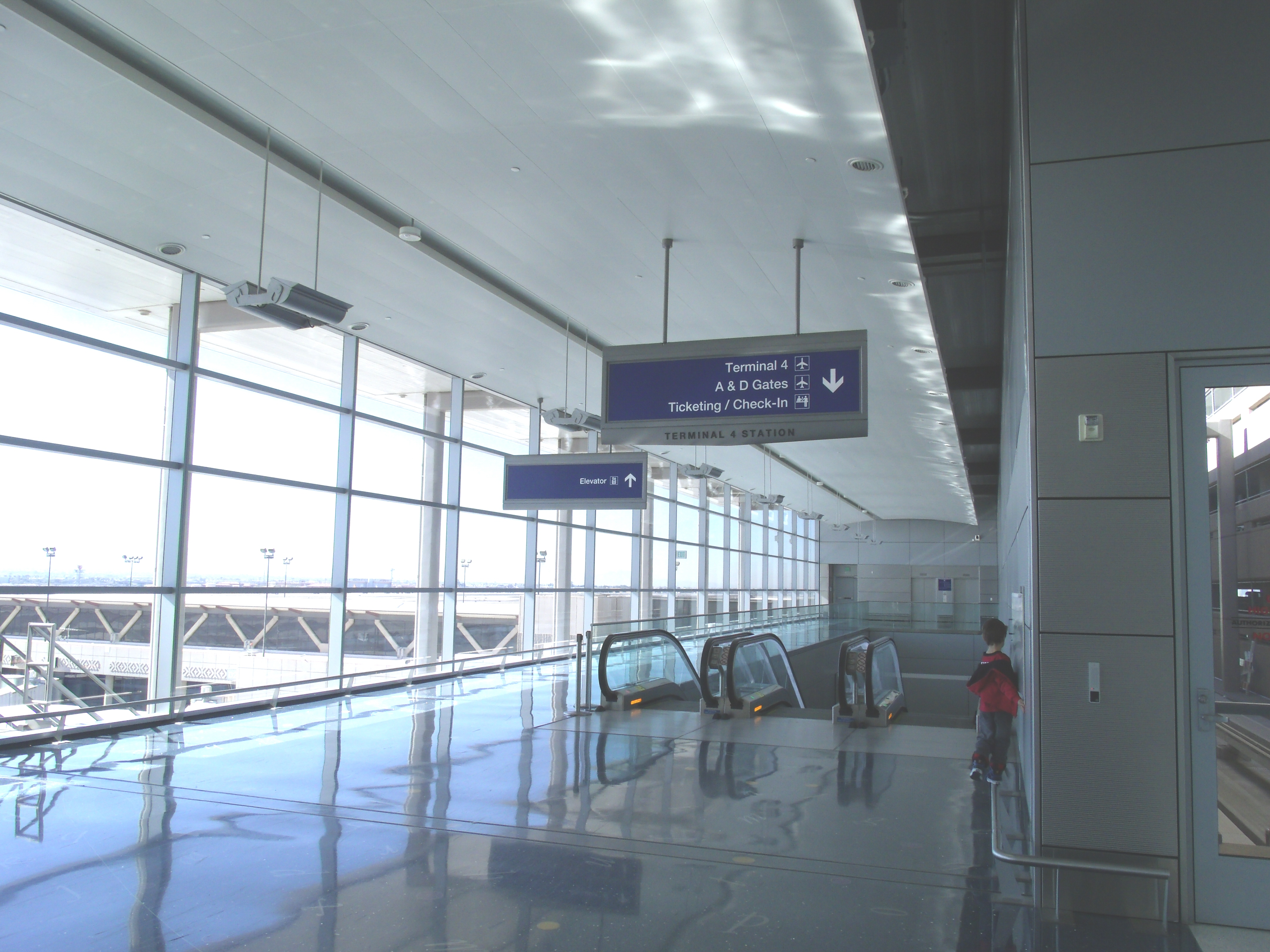
Inside PHX Sky Train Terminal 4 Station.

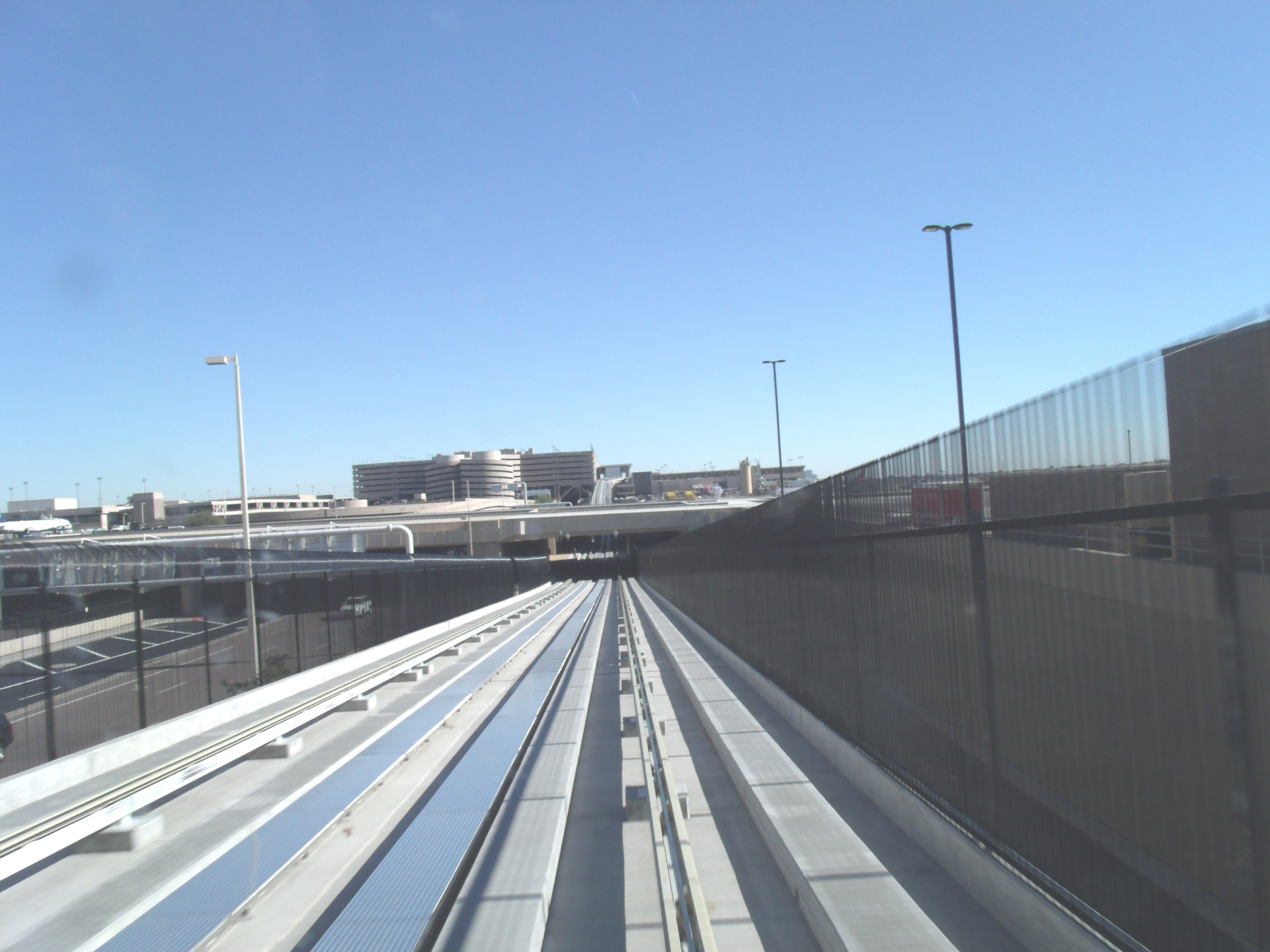
PHX Sky Train rails from terminals four to three.

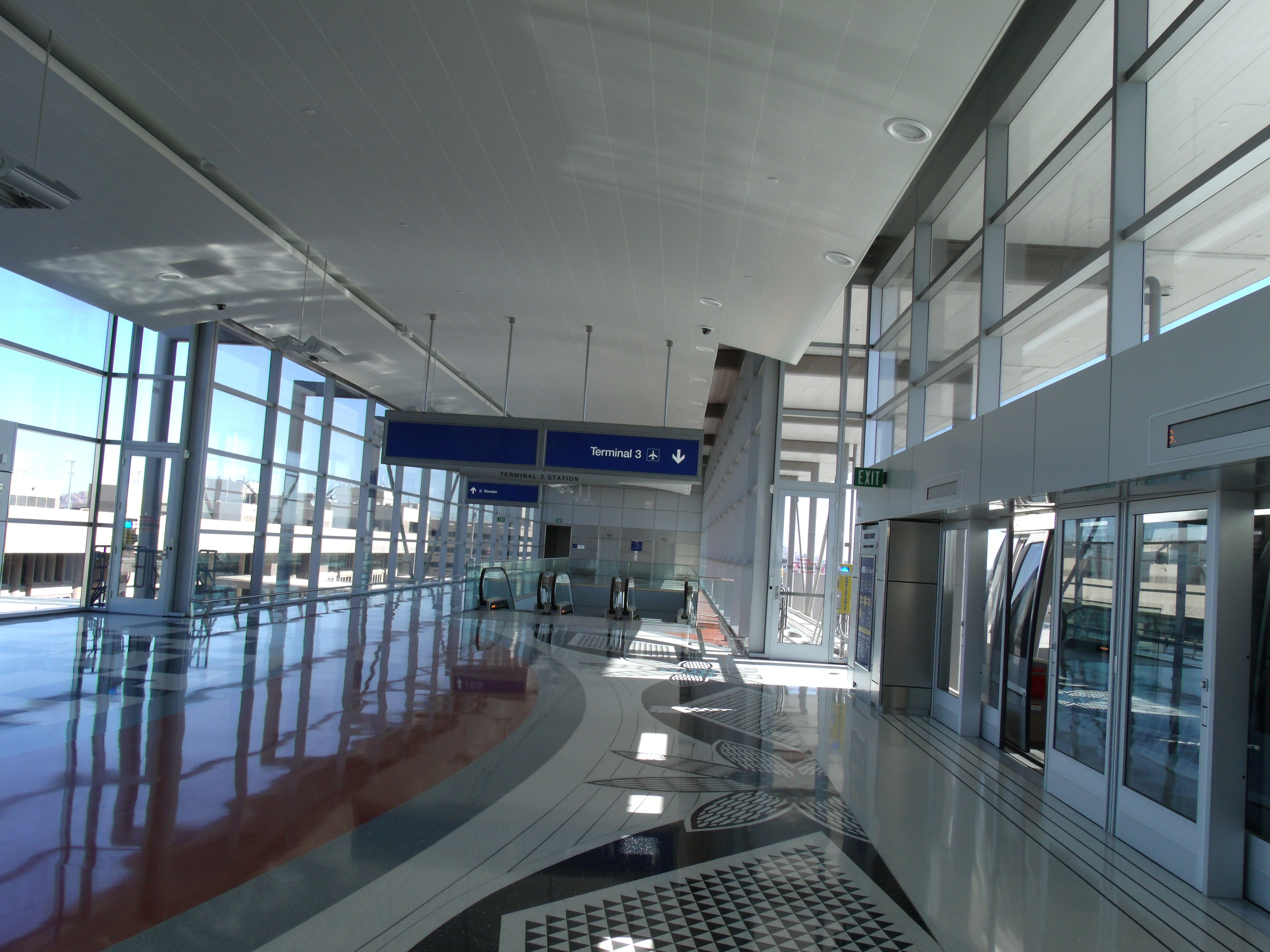
Inside PHX Sky Train Terminal 3 Station.

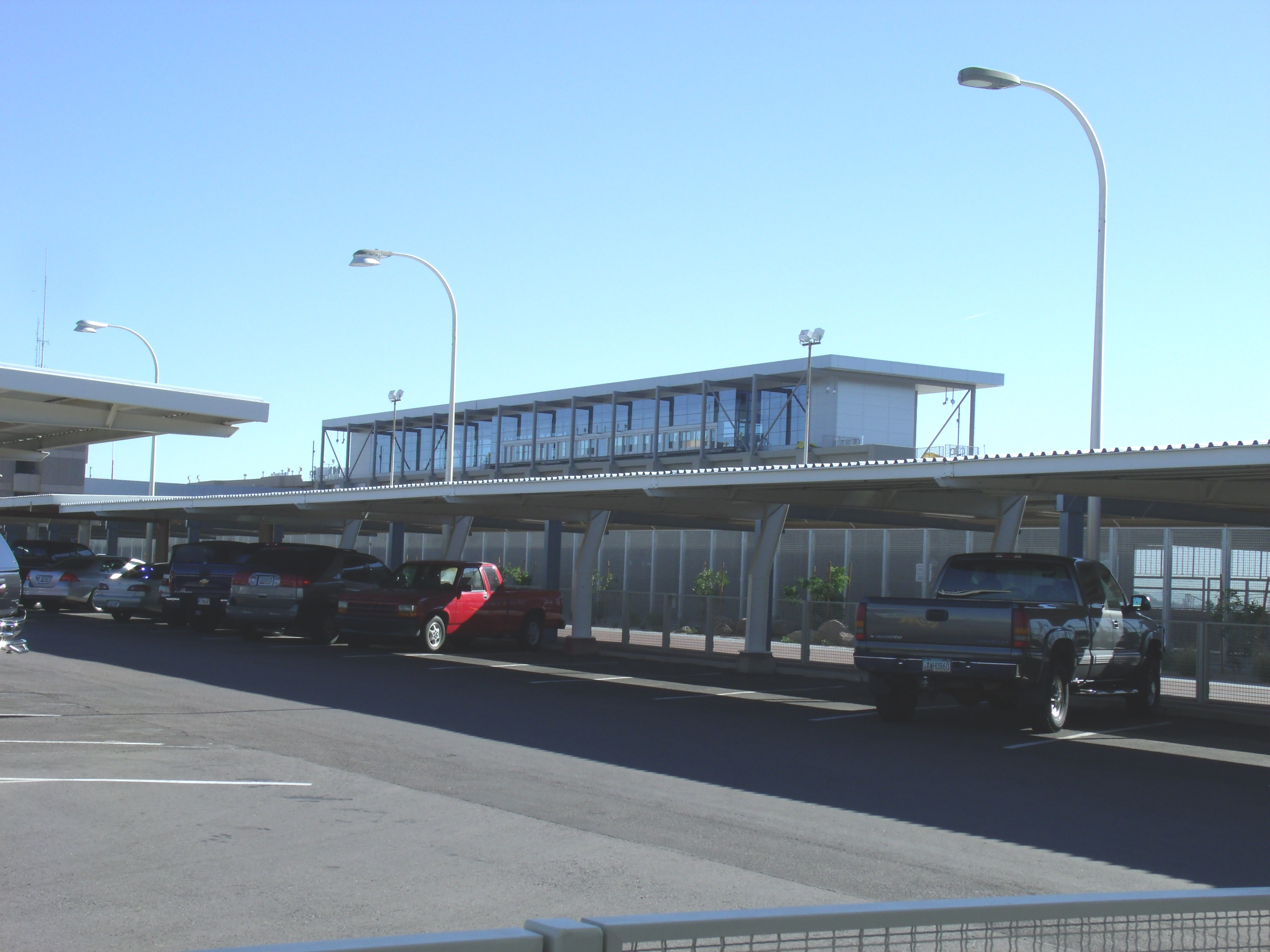
Outside PHX Sky Train Terminal 3 Station

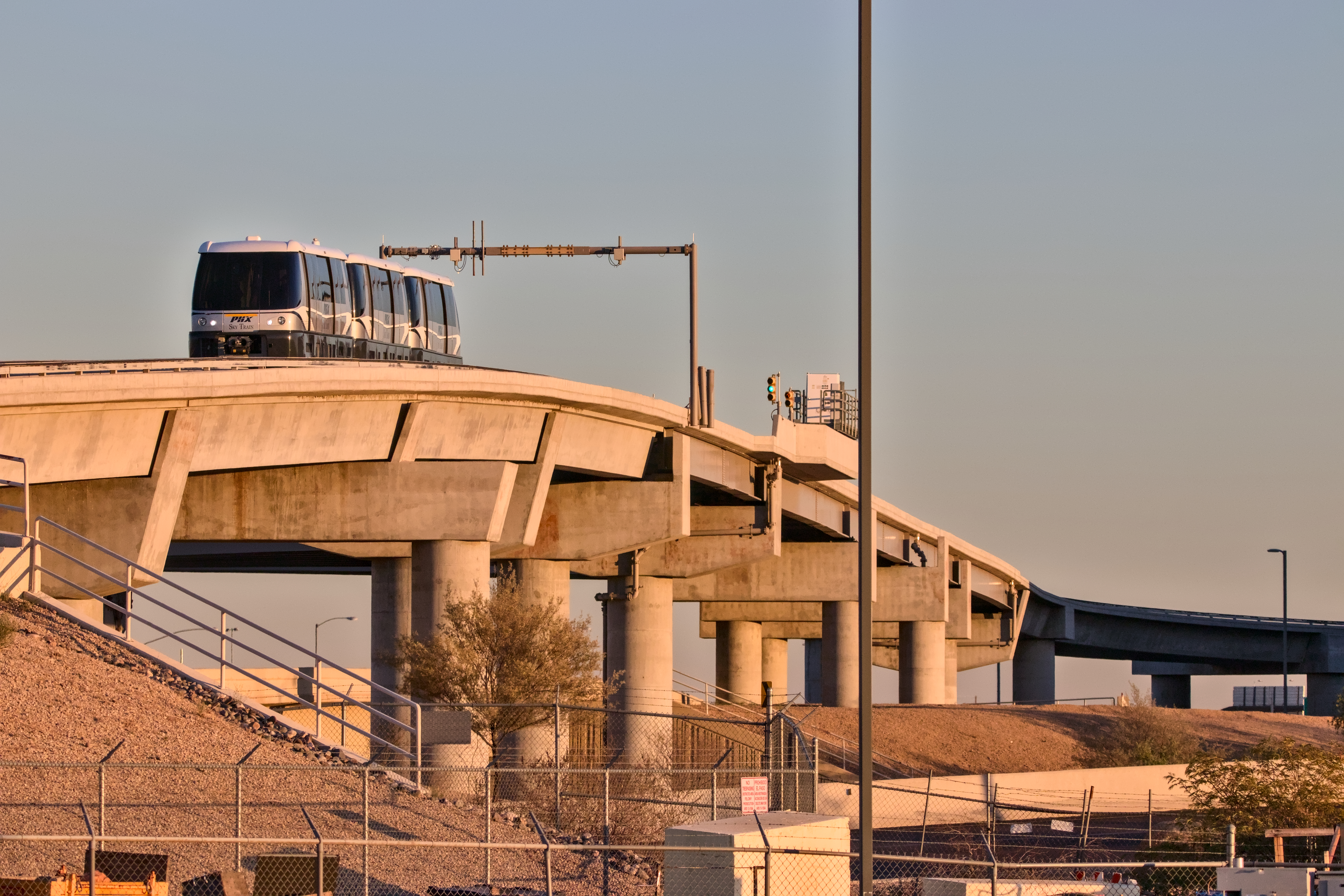
An elevated section of the track near the Bombardier Transportation maintenance offshoot
