= Innovia APM 200 =

Automated people mover manufactured by Bombardier

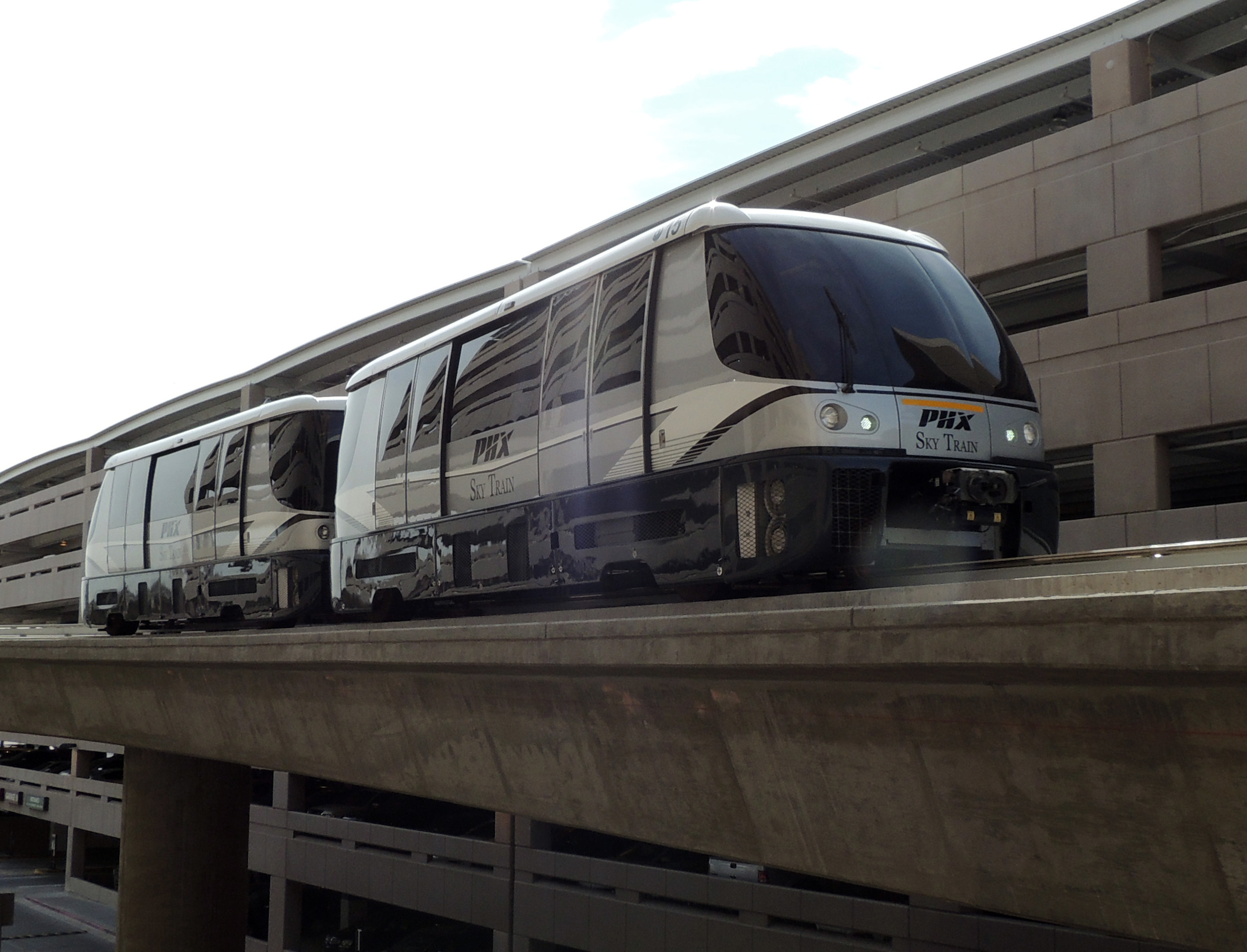
Bombardier Innovia APM 200 on the PHX Sky Train

The Innovia APM 200 is an automated people mover system (APM) manufactured and marketed by Bombardier Transportation (later Alstom). It was the second generation Innovia APM offered and is part of Alstom's Innovia series of fully automated transportation systems.

The Innovia APM 200 was the successor to the Innovia APM 100 and was succeeded by the Innovia APM 300. Designed in response to the growing popularity of the Crystal Mover, the advancements the Innovia APM 200 made over the Innovia APM 100 included a new aerodynamic design, allowing for greater speeds and tighter turns. The Innovia APM 200 also featured full composite construction, and multiple end cap options.

== Specifications ==
Each individual Innovia APM 200 car weighs 14.4 tonnes (15.9 short tons; 14.2 long tons) empty, with a weight of 21.627 tonnes (23.840 short tons; 21.285 long tons) with passengers. The car is configured to allow eight passengers to sit down, while 92 additional passengers can stand at a density of 2.7-square-foot (0.25 m^{2}) per passenger. If there is enough room two wheelchairs can fit in each Innovia APM 200 car, in addition to sitting and standing room. A maximum of four cars can be coupled together in a single train. Each car is air-conditioned, lit, and includes tinted windows attached to the composite shell body.

== Implementations ==
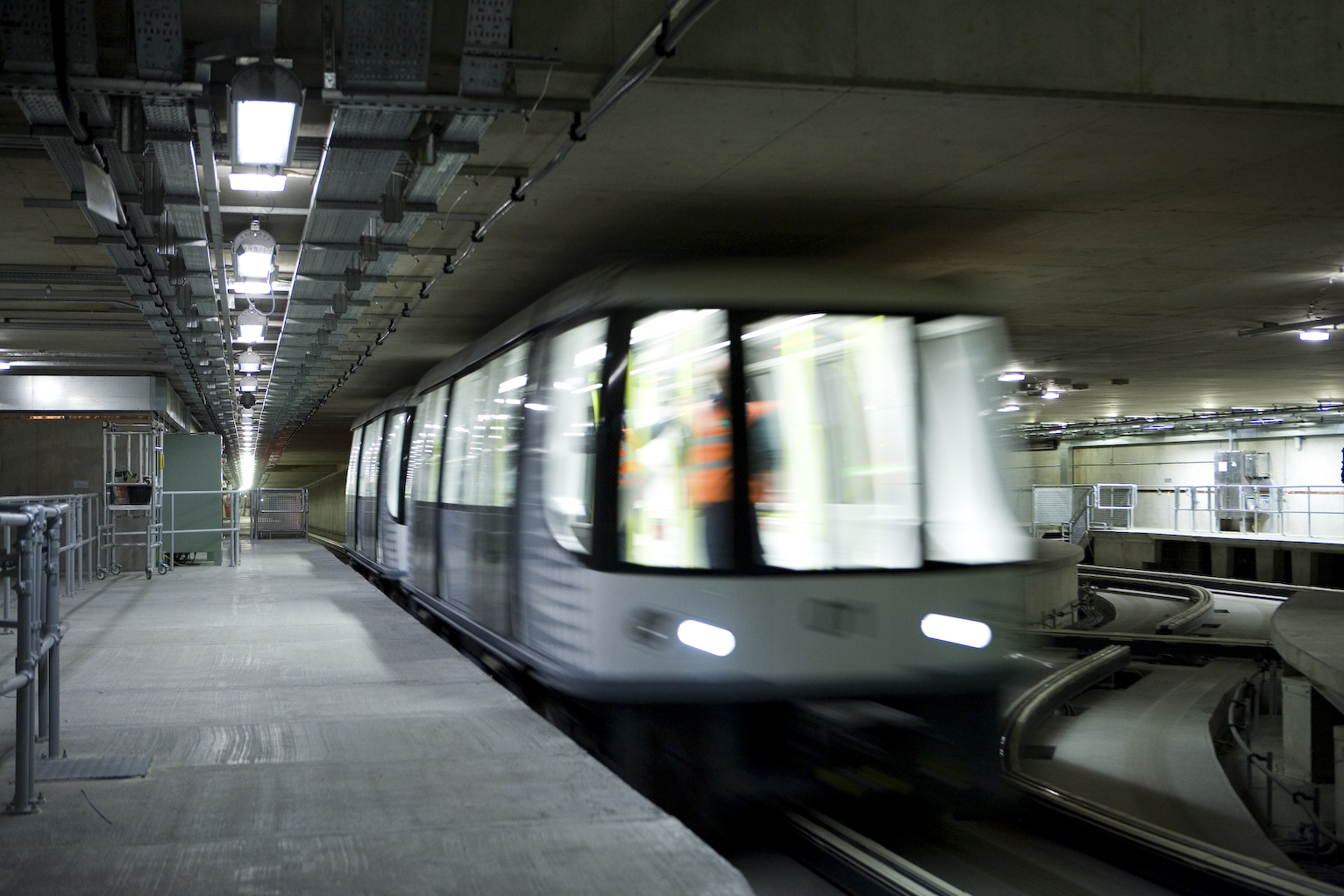
Innovia APM 200 on the Heathrow Terminal 5 Transit at London Heathrow Airport

- DFW Skylink (2005) – 4.81 miles (7.74 km), 10 stations, 64 vehicles
- Heathrow Terminal 5 Transit (2008) – airside system, 0.67 kilometres (0.42 mi), 3 stations, 10 vehicles
- PHX Sky Train (2013) – Built in three phases. Phase 1 opened April 2013, connecting the Valley Metro Rail station to the East Economy Parking Garage and Terminal 4. Phase 1A opened December 2013 extending the line to Terminal 3, with a covered walkway to Terminal 2. Phase 2 extended the line to the Rental Car Center, and opened in 2022. Now fully completed, the length of the line is 2.17 miles (3.49 km), serves 5 stations, and has a total of 18 vehicles.
