= Heathrow Terminal 5 Transit =

Automated people mover at London Heathrow Airport

Coordinates: 51.4709°N 0.4812°W

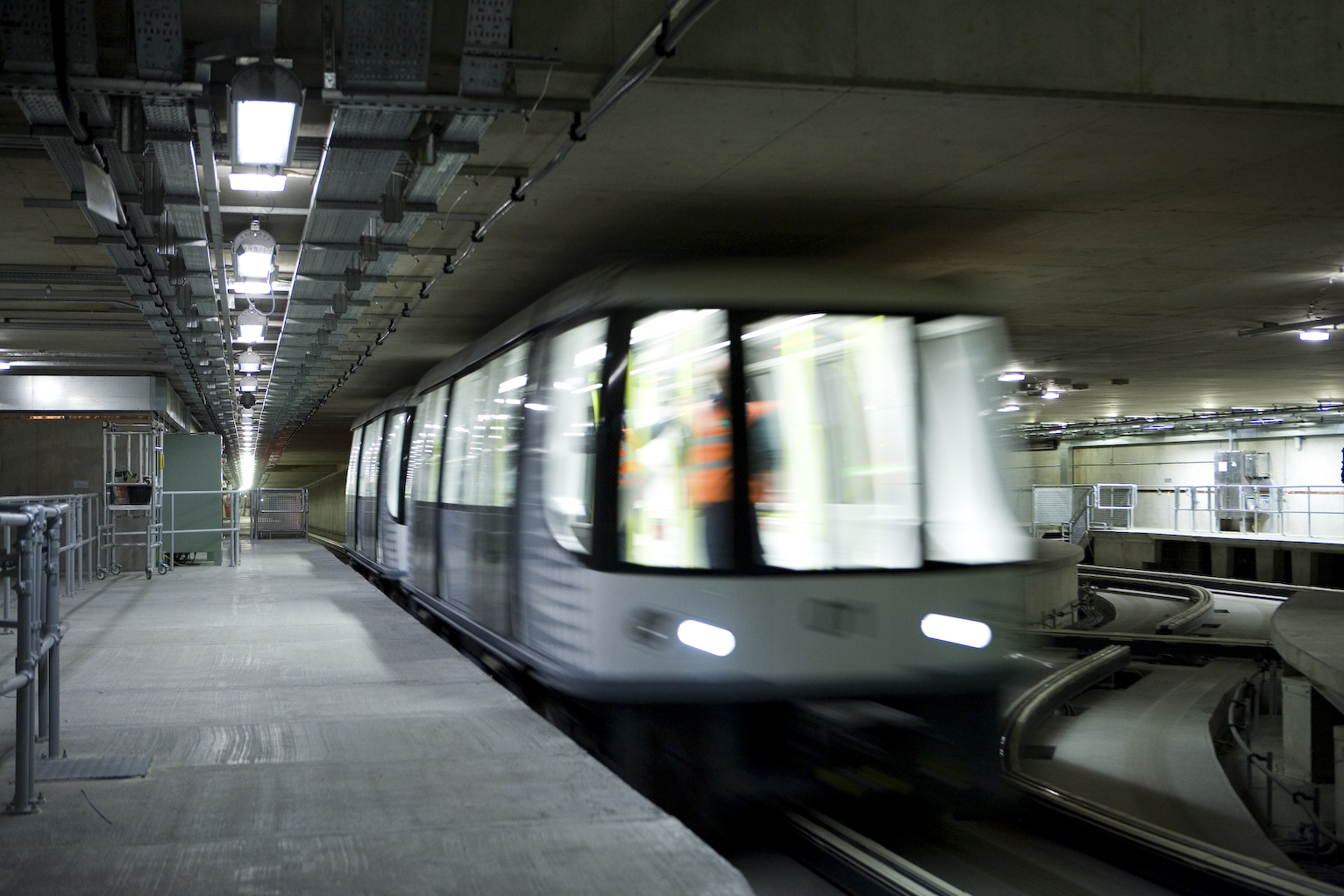
- A Bombardier Innovia APM 200 at Terminal 5

Overview
- Locale: Heathrow Airport
- Transit type: Automated guideway transit/People mover
- Number of lines: 1
- Number of stations: 3
- Annual ridership: 13 million per year
- Website: Heathrow Terminal 5 guide

Operation
- Began operation: 2008
- Operator: Heathrow Airport
- Character: Underground
- Rolling stock: 10 × Bombardier Innovia APM 200
- Number of vehicles: 8 in normal operation

Technical
- System length: 0.67 km (0.42 mi)
- Electrification: Third rail
System map
- This system has step-free access.

The Heathrow Terminal 5 Transit is an automated people mover system (APM) operating at Heathrow Airport in London, England. It operates in the Heathrow Terminal 5 complex and conveys air passengers between the main airport terminal and its satellite buildings, Terminals 5B and 5C.

== History ==
The Terminal 5 APM transit came into operation at the opening of Terminal 5 in 2008. It was the first ever deployment of the Innovia APM 200 vehicle. Initially the system had two stops, running between the main Terminal 5A and Terminal 5B, operated with two 3-car APM trains. In 2011, the line was extended to Terminal 5C and APM fleet was initially expanded to nine then later to ten vehicles.

== Route ==
The Heathrow Terminal 5 APM vehicles run in a dual-lane tunnel totalling 0.67 kilometres (0.42 miles) in length. The Transit System has three stations: the main Terminal 5A building (Gates A1-A23), Terminal 5B (Gates B32-B48), and Terminal 5C (Gates C52-C66). The people movers operate exclusively "airside", meaning that the system can only be accessed by passengers who have first passed through airport security.

A completely separate personal rapid transit system, the London Heathrow Terminal 5 PRT, operates "landside" between the car parks and Terminal 5.

== Vehicles ==
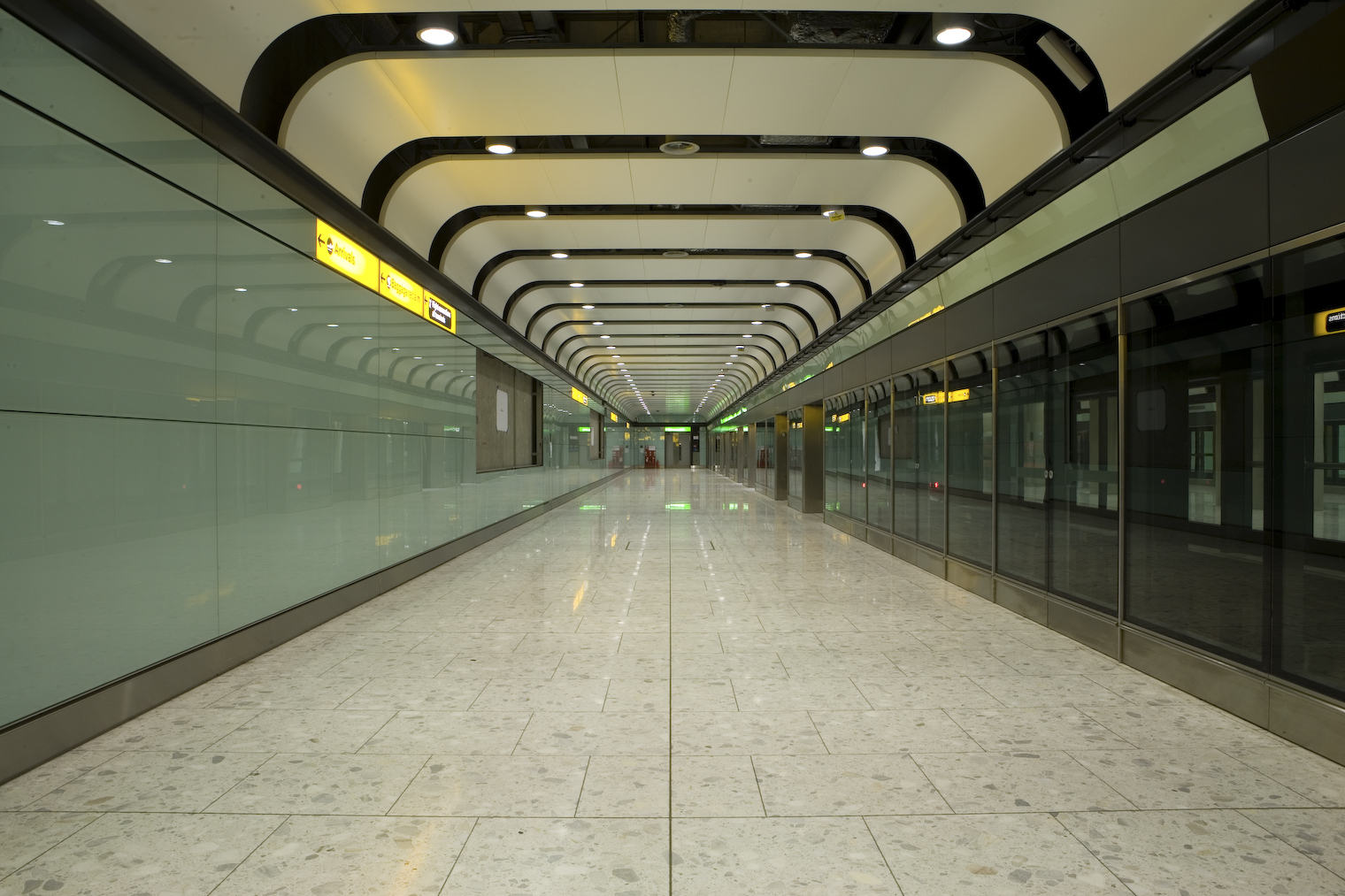
Heathrow Terminal 5 transit station

The transit system is run with a small fleet of ten Bombardier Innovia APM 200 vehicles which convey over 6,500 passengers per hour in each direction.

== See also ==
- Stansted Airport Transit System
