= AirTrain (San Francisco International Airport) =

People mover at San Francisco International Airport

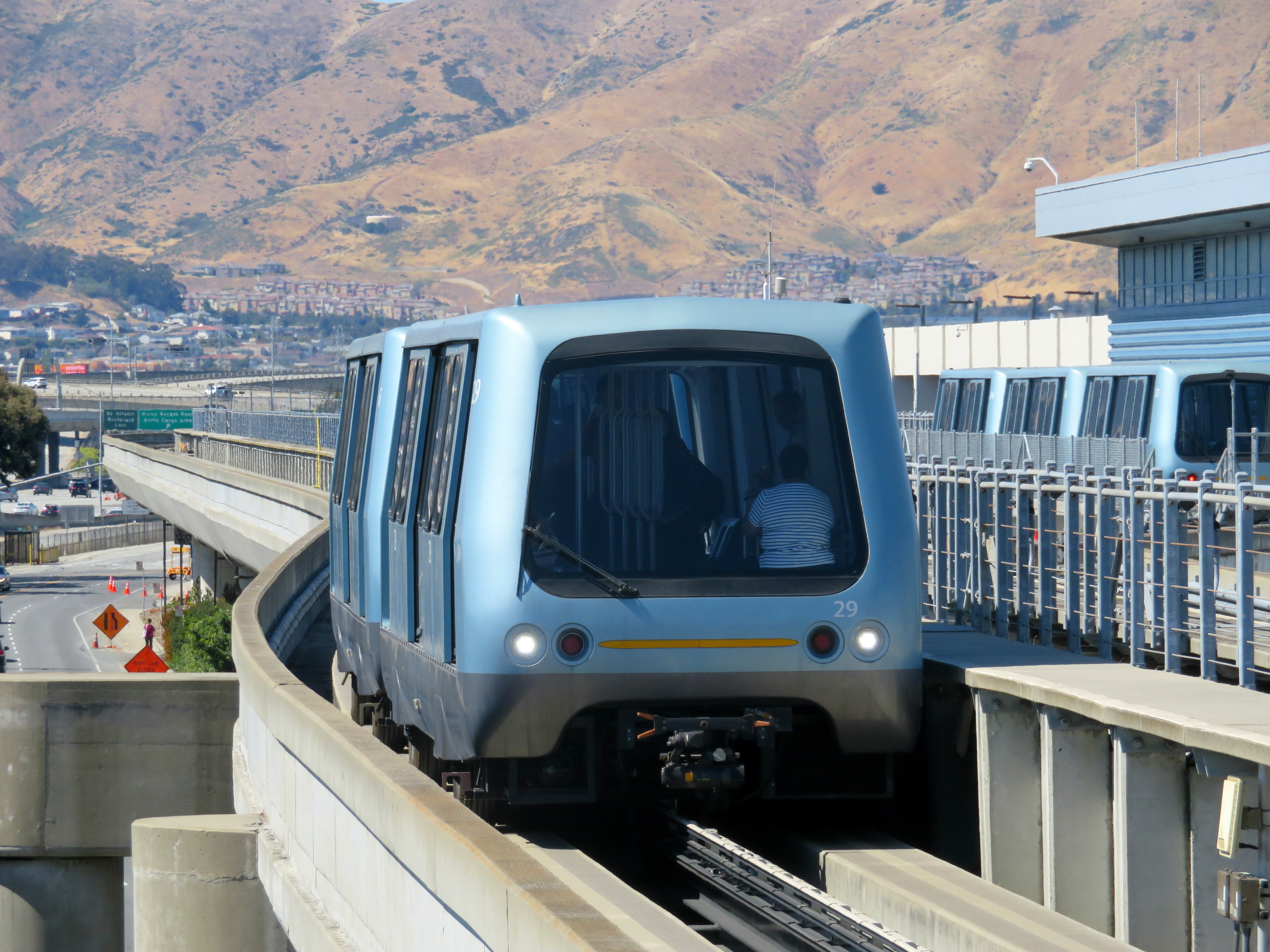
- AirTrain nearing West Field Road station in 2018

Overview
- Owner: San Francisco Airports Commission
- Locale: San Francisco International Airport
- Transit type: People mover
- Number of lines: 2
- Number of stations: 11
- Website: AirTrain

Operation
- Began operation: February 24, 2003; 23 years ago
- Operator: San Francisco Airports Commission
- Character: Automated people mover
- Number of vehicles: 38 Innovia APM 100

Technical
- System length: 3 mi (5 km)
- No. of tracks: 2
- Top speed: 30 mph (48 km/h)
System map
Red Line highlighted in red, Blue Line highlighted in blue
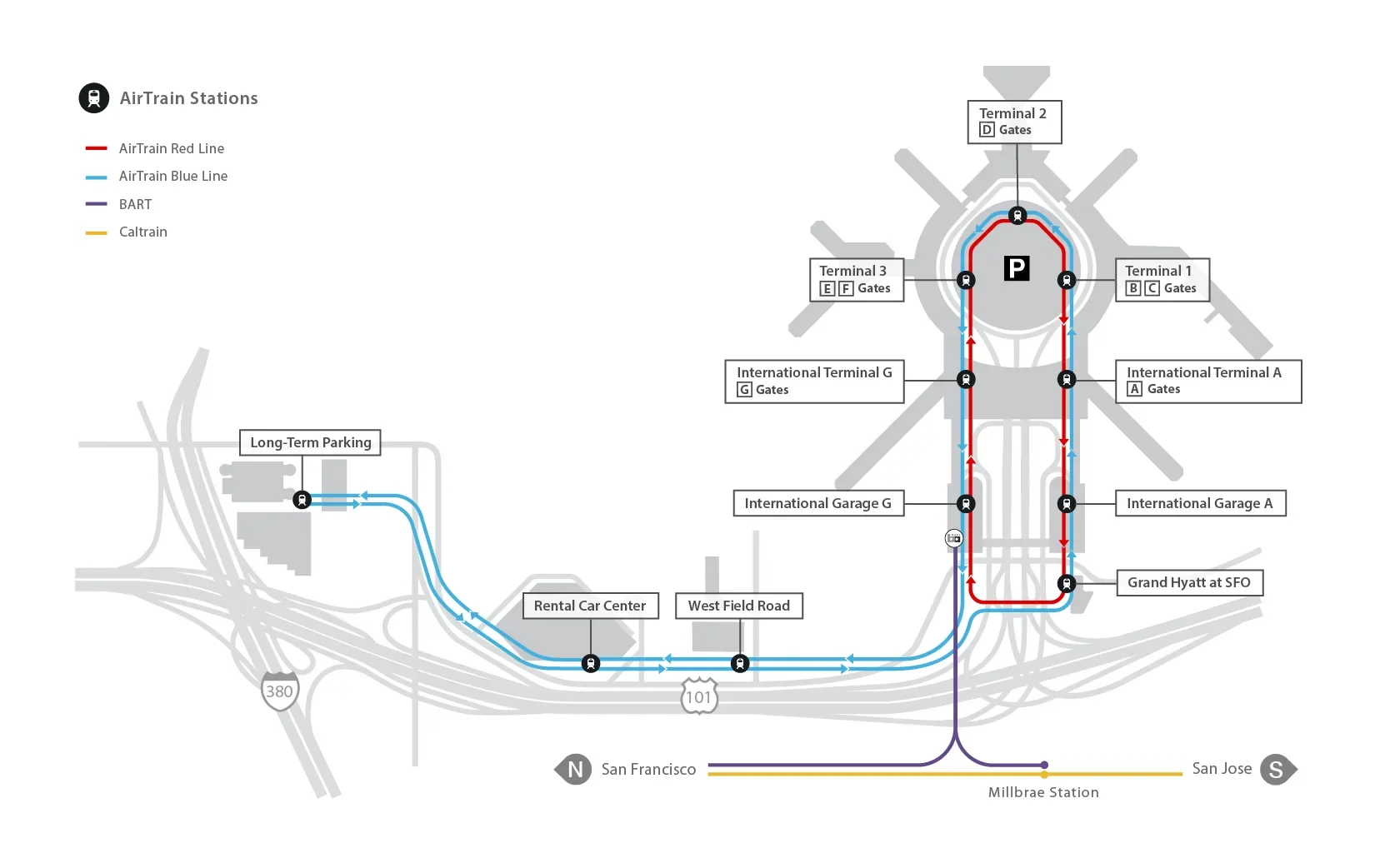

AirTrain is a fully automated people mover at San Francisco International Airport (SFO) that opened on February 24, 2003. It operates 24 hours a day on two separate lines, covering a total of three miles (4.8 km). The service charges no fares; it is funded by a fee charged to rental car customers. The system is located outside of the sterile area of each terminal, meaning passengers must exit and re-enter through a security checkpoint when using AirTrain to travel between terminals.

== Lines and stations ==
AirTrain operates on two lines—Red Line and Blue Line—both of which run every four minutes. The Red Line travels in a clockwise loop around the central terminal area, which takes about nine minutes to complete. The Blue Line travels in a counterclockwise loop, serving the same stations in reverse order, and also proceeding to West Field Road, the Rental Car Center, and long-term parking, which takes 25 minutes for a round trip.

Station	Lines	Notes
Grand Hyatt at SFO	Red Line; Blue Line	Airport hotel
Garage A	Red Line; Blue Line	
International Terminal A	Red Line; Blue Line	
Harvey Milk Terminal 1	Red Line; Blue Line	
Terminal 2	Red Line; Blue Line	Services Terminal 3 during closure of its station
Terminal 3	Red Line; Blue Line	Closed until 2027 for Terminal 3 West renovation
International Terminal G	Red Line; Blue Line	
Garage G / BART	Red Line; Blue Line	Transfer to Bay Area Rapid Transit
West Field Road	Blue Line	West cargo area facilities/employee parking
Rental Car Center	Blue Line	
Long-Term Parking	Blue Line	

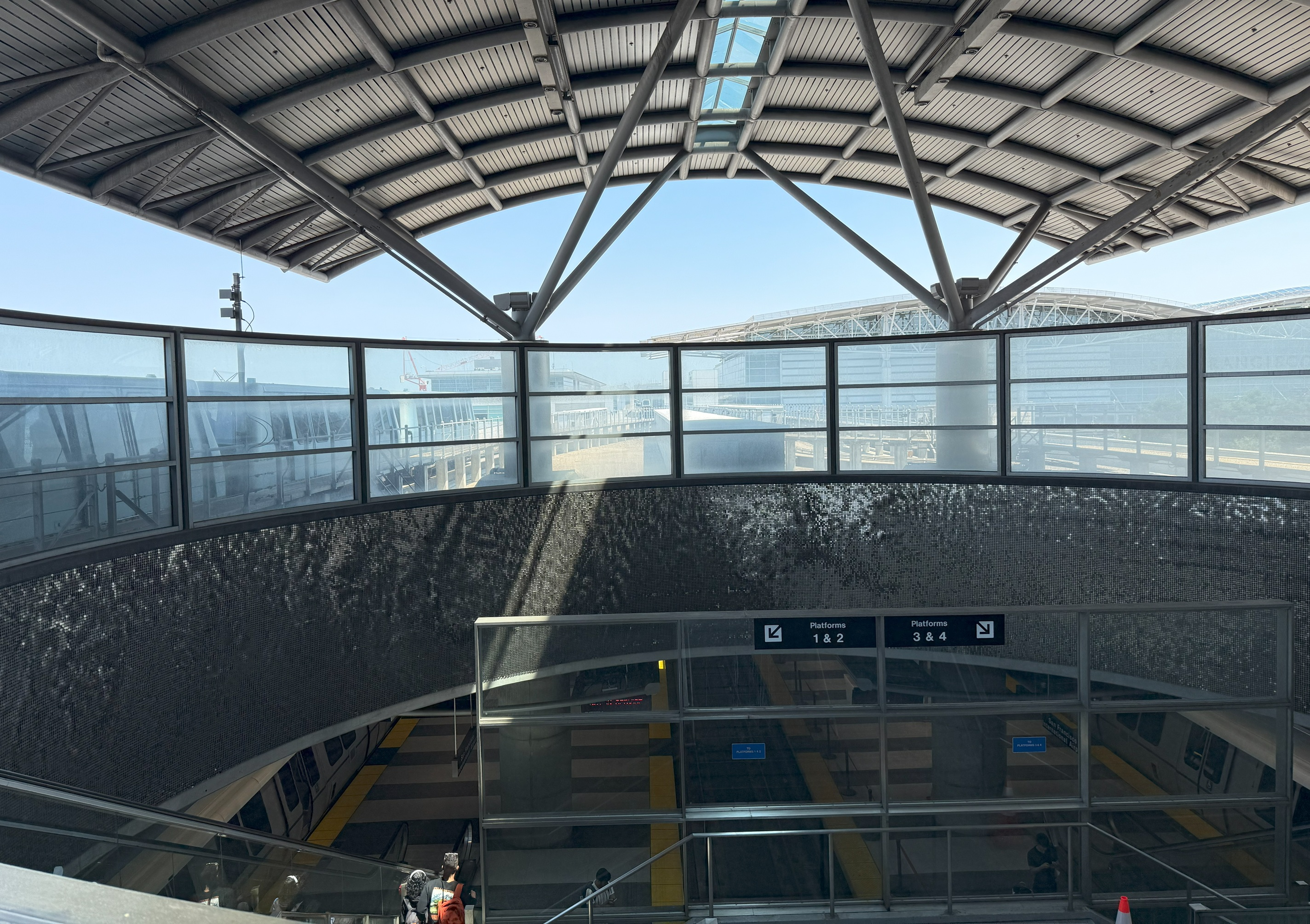
AirTrain floor above the BART station at Garage G

The AirTrain stations at the International Terminal are located one level above ticketing, at both ends of the main hall. Stations at Terminals 1, 2, and 3 are located on level 5 of the domestic parking garage and can be accessed from mezzanine-level skybridges located near security checkpoints B, D, and F. The Garage A and G stations are accessible from level 7 of each garage. The long-term parking station is connected by a skybridge to level 5 of the long-term parking garage. The Garage G station is one level above the BART station at SFO, serving as the system's point of connection with external rail transit.

== History ==
The AirTrain system opened on March 3, 2003, at a cost of $430 million. It was developed alongside other major early-2000s improvements at the airport, including construction of the International Terminal, two parking garages, and the BART station. The initial system connected the airport’s four terminals, three parking garages, the consolidated Rental Car Center, and the BART station. Its operation enabled the removal of rental car shuttle buses, reducing roadway congestion and improving air quality around the terminal complex.

A $15 million infill station was constructed to serve the Grand Hyatt at SFO, a new airport hotel. The hotel opened on October 7, 2019.

AirTrain did not originally provide access to SFO's long-term parking garage and lots; instead, passengers had to take a free airport shuttle bus between the airport terminals and the long-term parking areas. The original end of the track past the Rental Car Center station was only about 600 yards (550 m) away from the airport's long-term parking garage; an extension to the garage began service in May 2021, replacing the shuttle buses. The extension is estimated to eliminate 600,000 miles (970,000 km) previously driven by the shuttle buses each year.

The Harvey Milk Terminal 1 station was closed from July 2021 to April 26, 2023, during reconstruction of the terminal.

The Terminal 3 station closed on November 4, 2025 for the Terminal 3 West renovation; it is intended to reopen in 2027. During its closure, service to Terminal 3 is provided by the Terminal 2 station, which is temporarily renamed as the Terminals 2 & 3 station.

== Technical details ==
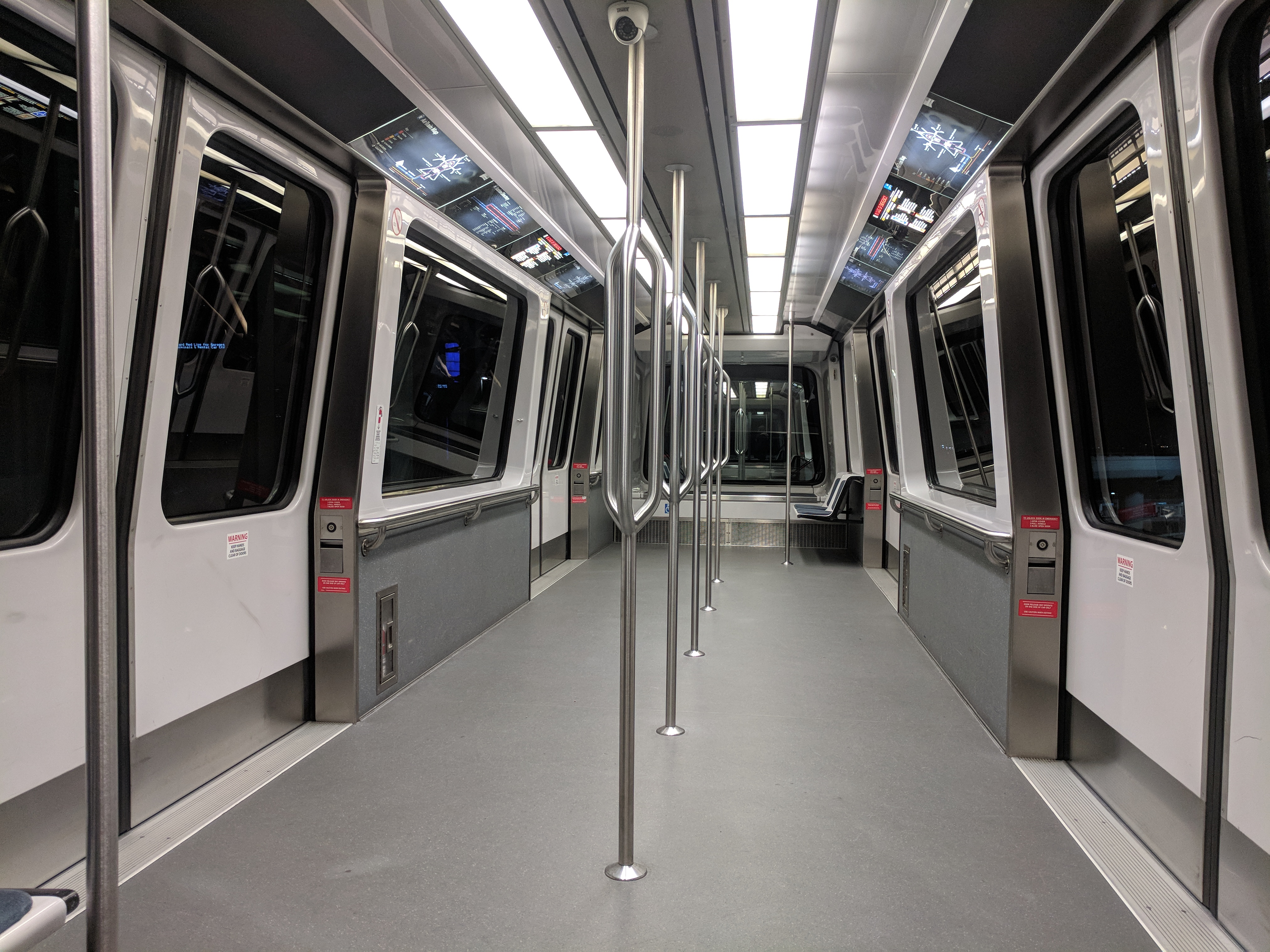
Interior of an AirTrain car

The AirTrain system was built by Bombardier Transportation at a cost of US $430 million and is composed of 38 Innovia APM 100 cars coupled in trains of up to three cars. The APM 100 cars can also be found at airports in Tampa, Denver, Atlanta, Seattle-Tacoma, Houston, and Madrid. They are operated automatically under Bombardier's Cityflo 650 Communications-based train control signaling technology, making it one of the first radio-based train control systems to enter service. The entire AirTrain fleet is accessible and allows rented baggage carts on board.

The Airport Development Plan from 2016 forecasted that ridership on the two lines would be over capacity in the future (42% and 87% over capacity on the Red and Blue Lines respectively) and recommended upgrades that would increase capacity. Specific upgrades included acquiring 30 additional AirTrain cars, upgrading existing stations to accommodate 4-car trains, and upgrading the maintenance facility to accommodate additional vehicles.

== See also ==
- Airport rail link
- Oakland Airport Connector
