= Stansted Airport Transit System =

Automated people mover at London Stansted Airport

Coordinates: 51.8891°N 0.2565°E

Stansted Airport Track Transit System
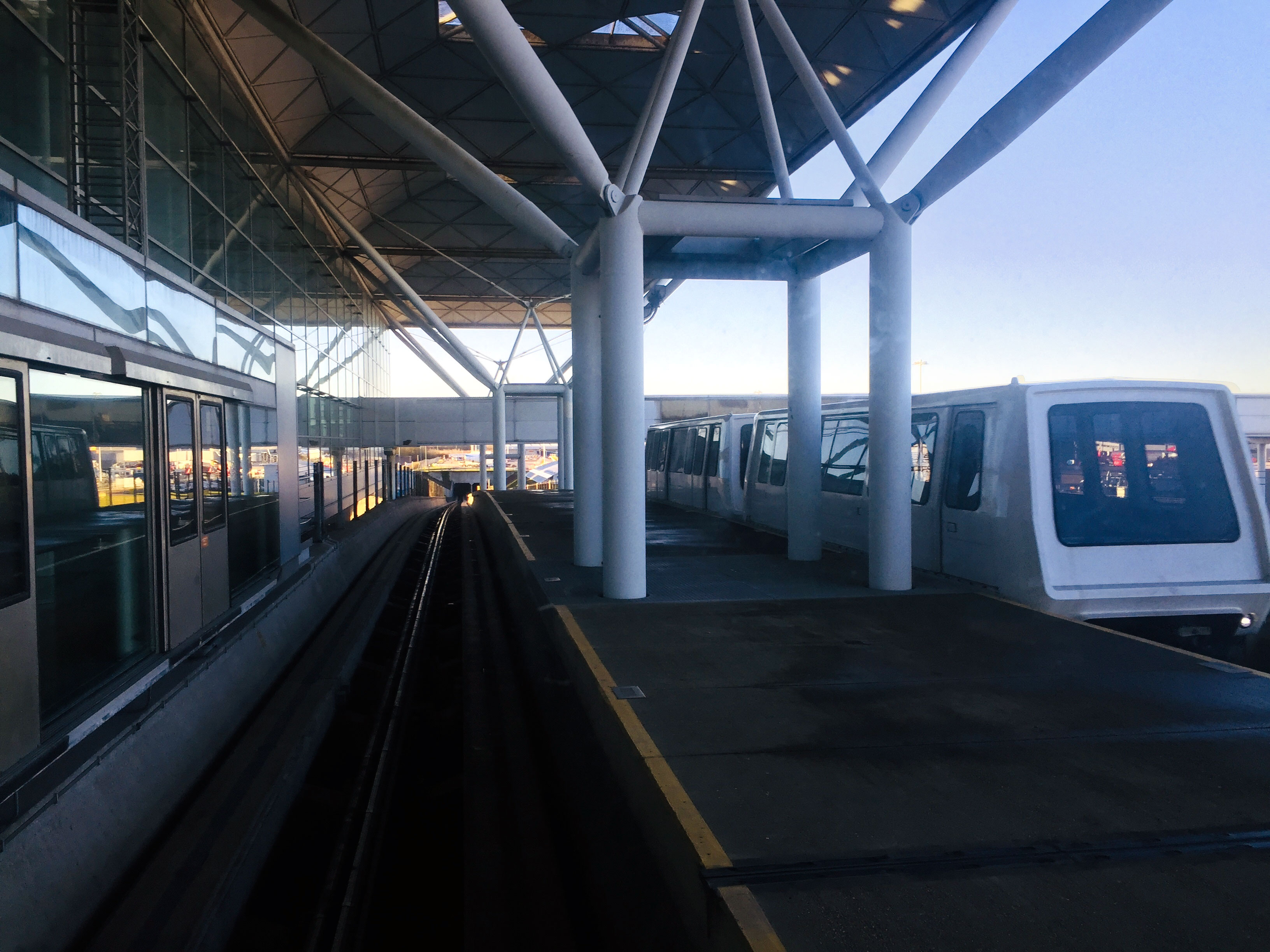
- An Adtranz C-100 vehicle approaches the Terminal station

Overview
- Locale: London Stansted Airport, Essex, England, UK
- Transit type: Automated guideway transit/people mover
- Number of lines: 1
- Number of stations: 3
- Daily ridership: 36,000
- Annual ridership: 11.5 million
- Website: Stansted Airport Terminal Guide

Operation
- Began operation: 1991
- Ended operation: 2026 (proposed)
- Operator: Stansted Airport Limited
- Character: Elevated (Depot to Main Terminal); Underground (Gates 1-39/satellites 1 and 2)
- Rolling stock: 5× Adtranz C-100; 4× Adtranz CX-100
- Number of vehicles: 8 in normal operation; 9 in total

Technical
- System length: 2 miles (3.2 km)
- Electrification: Central third rail

The Stansted Airport Track Transit System (TTS) is a fully automated people mover system which operates within London Stansted Airport in England, United Kingdom.

The transit system conveys air travellers between the main airport terminal and the departure/arrival gates, which are located some distance from the main terminal in satellite buildings 1 and 2. The system operates exclusively "airside", meaning that it can only be accessed by passengers who have first passed through airport security. The transit is provided free of charge, with easy access for disabled passengers and is fully electric, much less polluting than the diesel buses that serve the car parks and remote aircraft stands.

It is planned to decommission the Stansted TTS in March of 2027 as part of a redevelopment project, and replace the transit system with pedestrian bridges.

== History ==
The Stansted Airport Transit System was opened in 1991. It was constructed as a result of the decision by the British Airports Authority (BAA) to redevelop the airport with an arrangement of satellite buildings detached from the main terminal. The BAA considered several options for conveying passengers safely and rapidly to the airport gates, including moving walkways, tunnels, bridges and bus links, before opting for an automated tracked transit system. After opening in 1991 the system, the system initially only served satellite 1. It was then extended in 1998 with an additional underground station to serve satellite 2, where it serves gates 20-39. The tunnel extends beyond satellite 2 to satellite 3, but trains only use this to change direction and proceed to pick up arriving passengers. While satellite 3 is not served by the TTS, there is an unused station below satellite 3. This station was built with the intention to serve satellite 3 in the future and to replace the walkway, with areas on the planning application's floor-plans indicating a safeguarded zone for the escalators between gates 48 and 49. However, once it was later apparent that walking to the satellite would be quicker than taking the transit (due to the lengthy wait at existing stations to allow passengers to alight), the airport decided it was best not to connect it to the system, and the area underneath remains unused and unfurnished, with concrete infill panels covering the floorspace for the intended escalators for departing and arriving passengers. It is not accessible to passengers as the only entrance to it is via an outside door which can only be accessed by staff.

There is an empty tunnel extending beyond satellite 3 to a future satellite 4 where the remote stands are, but it remains empty without tracks and the opening can only be partially seen on satellite imagery at SAT4's intended location.

== Route ==
=== Guideway ===
The Stansted Airport TTS vehicles run along a double-track guideway totalling 3.2 kilometres (2.0 mi) in length which connects the main terminal building with two satellite buildings. The route begins on an elevated section alongside the departure lounge, before entering a tunnel which passes beneath the airport apron. There is an elevated maintenance depot at one end.

=== Stations ===
The Transit System has three stations: Terminal (arrivals and departures at separate points), Gates 1–19 (Satellite 1 arrivals and departures) and Gates 20–39 (Satellite 2 arrivals and departures). Satellite 3 (Gates 40–59) is not served by the Transit System; instead a pedestrian footway links the gates with the main terminal.

Each station has segregated boarding and alighting platforms, allowing a more efficient passenger flow. All boarding points are equipped with platform screen doors.

== Vehicles ==
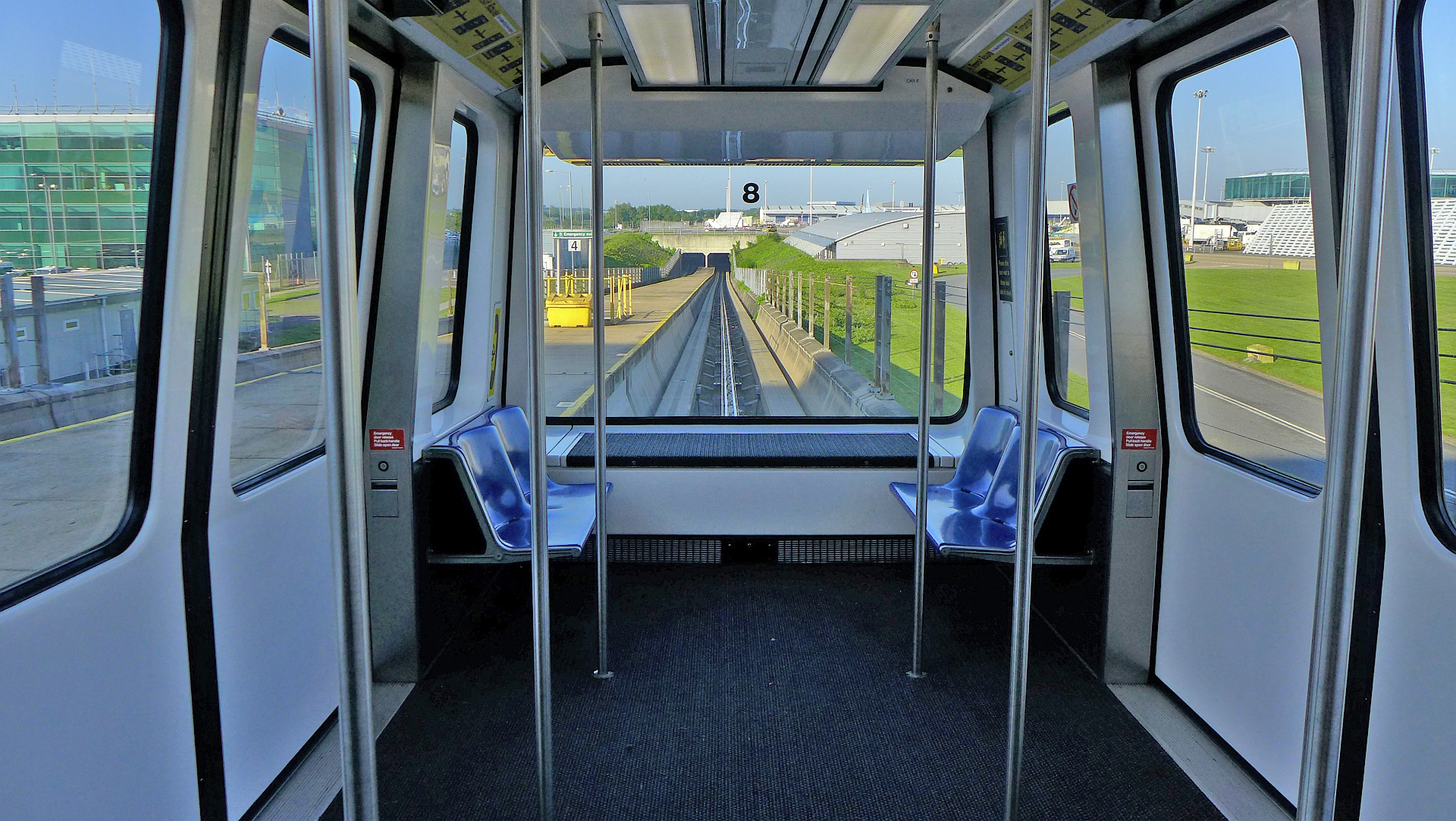
Interior of a Transit (CX-100)

Five Adtranz C-100 cars built by Westinghouse for the system, with car bodies built in Scotland by Walter Alexander before being shipped to Pittsburgh for assembly and testing, are still in service today. This was increased to nine vehicles when four new Adtranz CX-100 cars were delivered during the 1998 expansion. During normal operation, eight out of the nine cars will be in service to maintain a 99.98% availability record. The cars can operate as single-, double-, or triple-unit trains that can be easily accessed by disabled passengers. The trains are fully automated and driverless, classed as a Grade of Automation level 4 (unattended) system and regulated by the Office of Rail Regulation. The Stansted TTS is currently the world's last remaining APM system to use the Adtranz C-100 rolling stock.

== Planned closure ==
In April 2023, Manchester Airport Group, the owner of Stansted Airport, announced the Airport Route 43 project to expand the airport. As part of this scheme, the Stansted Track Transit System (TTS) will be decommissioned in March of 2027.

The decision to decommission the TTS was based on various issues related to its age and operational limitations. Originally designed in the 1980s with an intended lifespan of 20-25 years, the system was already exceeding its expected operational period. Components such as the carriages, track, power systems, software, communication systems, fire systems, door sets within stations, and other safety features were becoming obsolete, with manufacturer support no longer available, replacing the entire system was deemed cost-prohibitive which was estimated around £64 million. The TTS had also become a cause of bottlenecks due to lack of TTS vehicles, as it delivered large groups of passengers simultaneously to the border control area.

After closing the system, the TTS track will undergo partial demolition, with the track underneath the existing canopy being removed. The remaining track, supporting structure, and TTS maintenance facility will remain intact but not operational. The plan is to replace the TTS system with pedestrian Sky Link bridges, so both outbound and inbound passengers would walk to and from their gates which will increase the journey time to the boarding gates. During the development passengers will continue to use the TTS system until the bridges are finished and commissioned, once in use the TTS will be decommissioned. On 31 October 2023 London Stansted Airport was granted planning permission to extend its terminal building and decommission the Stansted TTS.

== Pictures ==
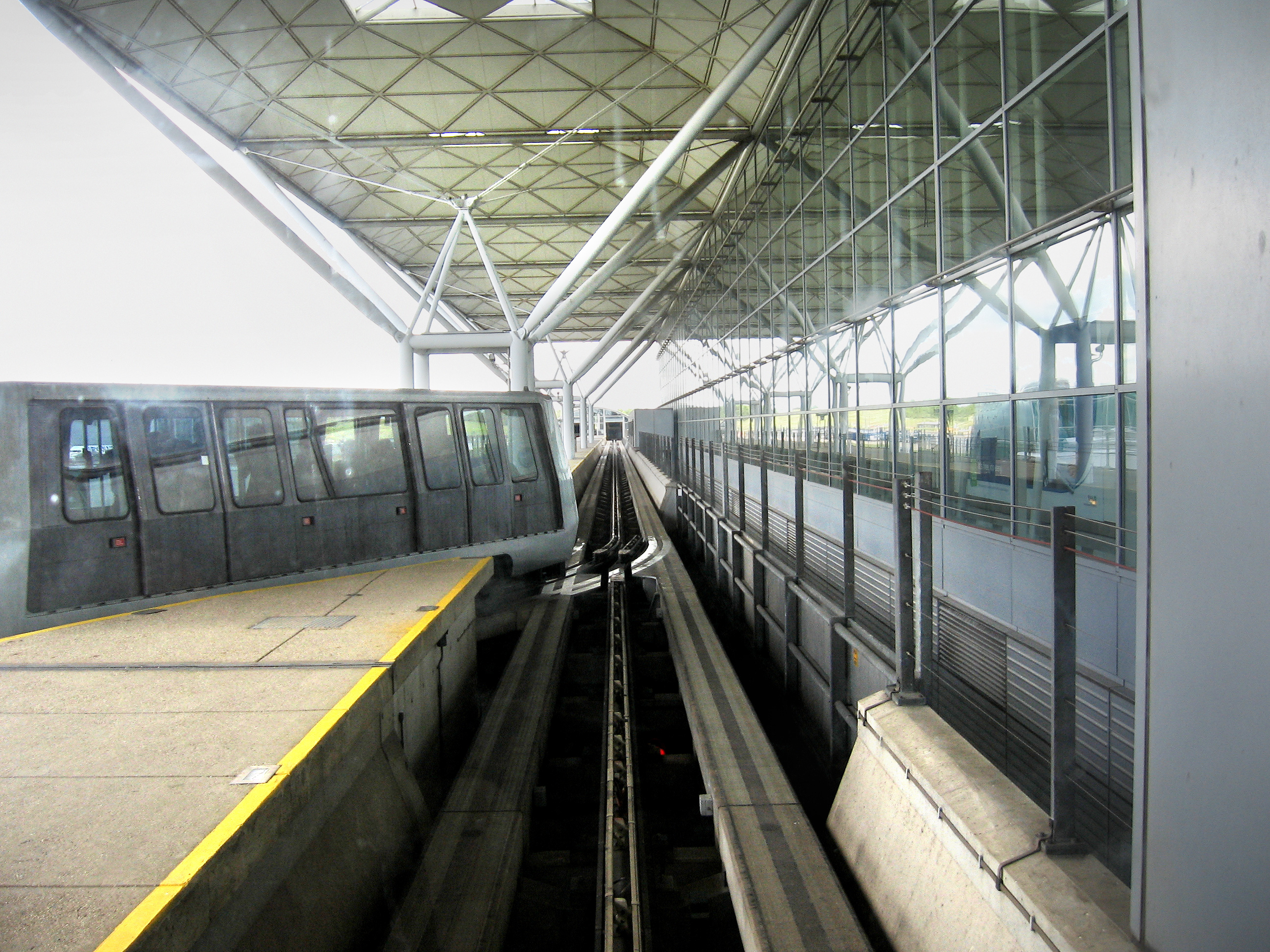
An Adtranz C-100 vehicle approaching the Main Terminal

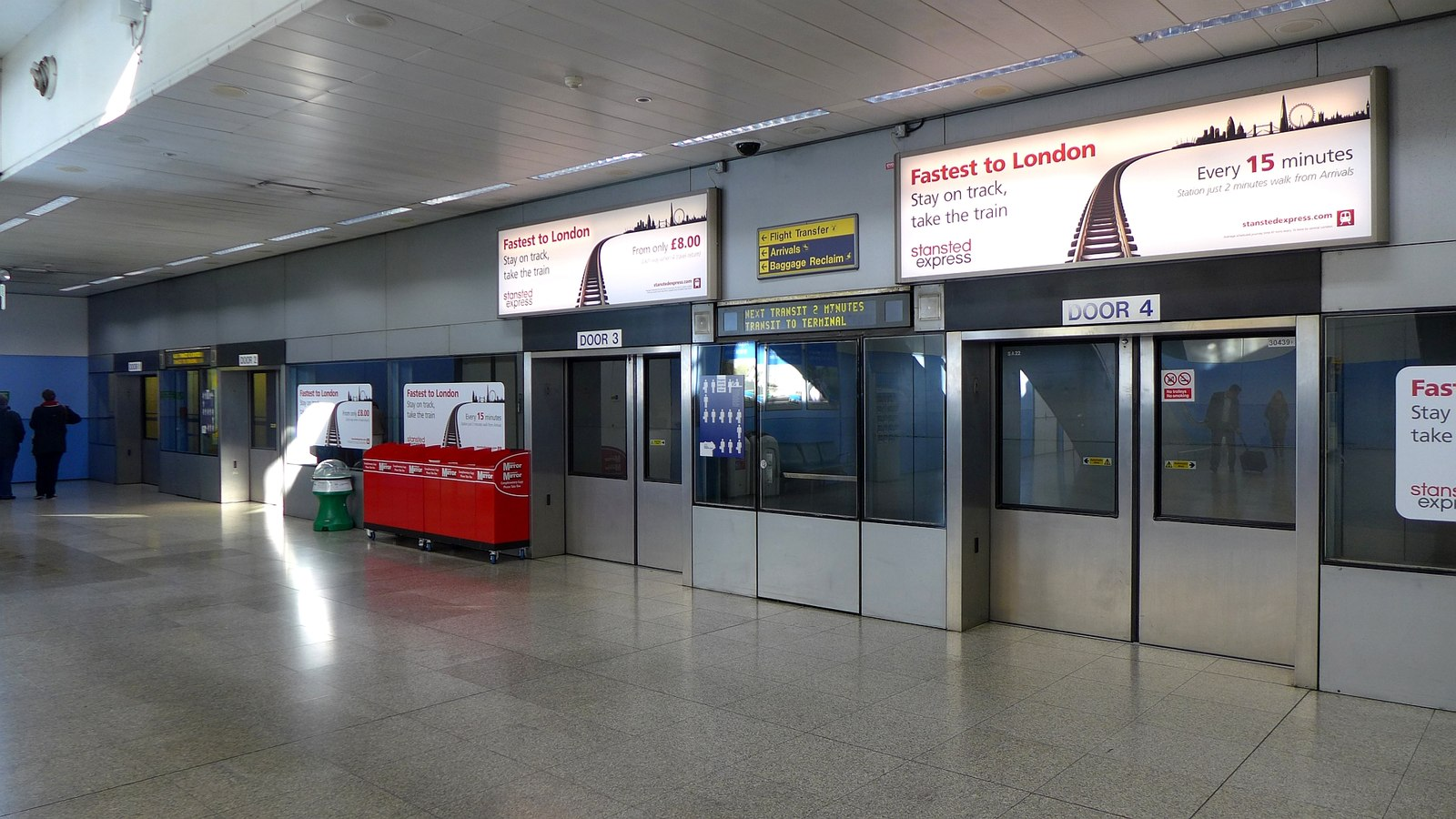
Platform doors at a Transit station

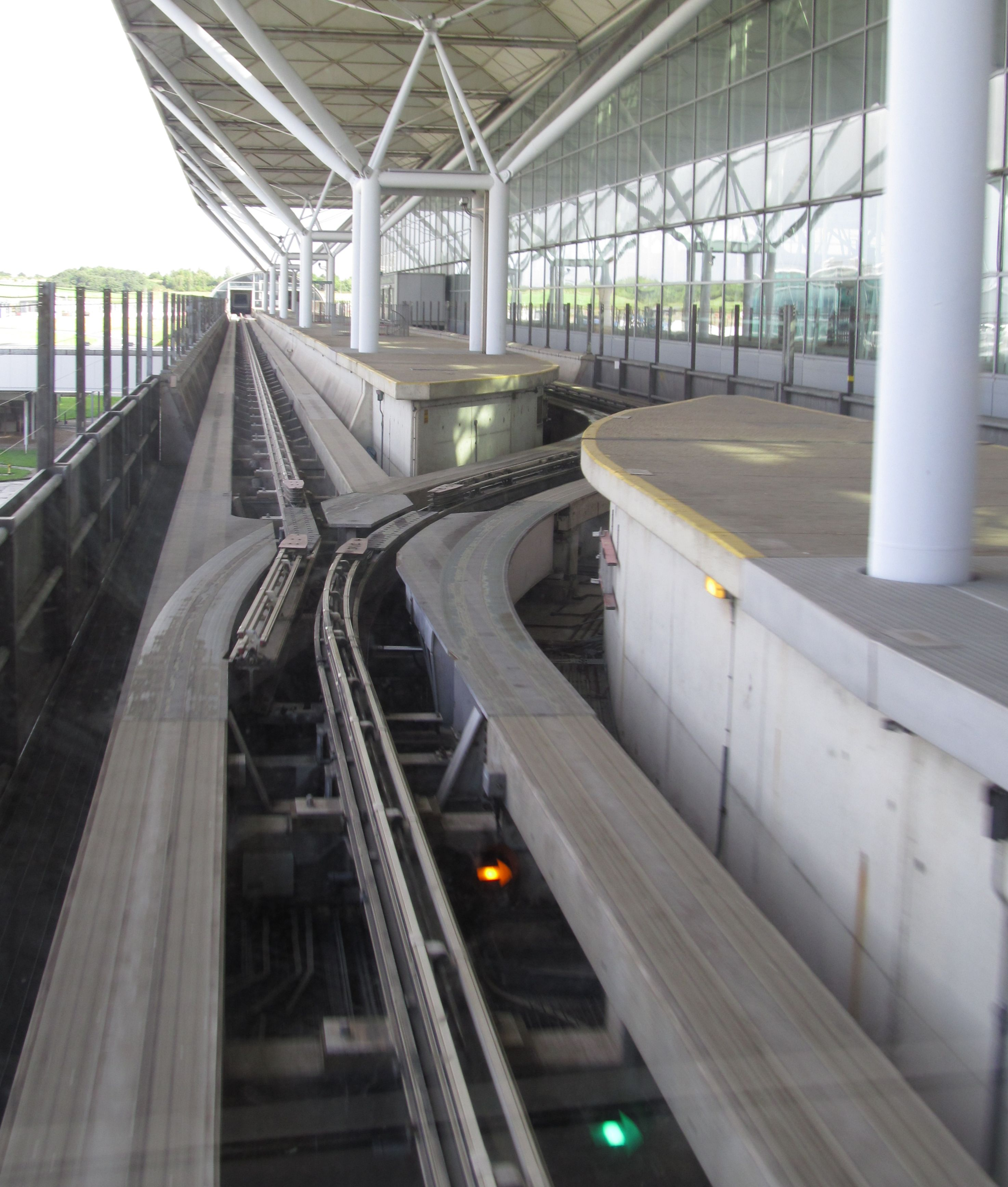
Set of points for a crossover connecting the two tracks

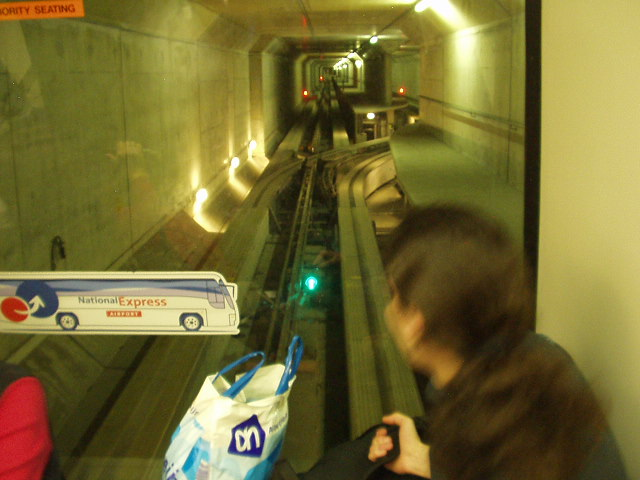
A Transit vehicle in the tunnel section

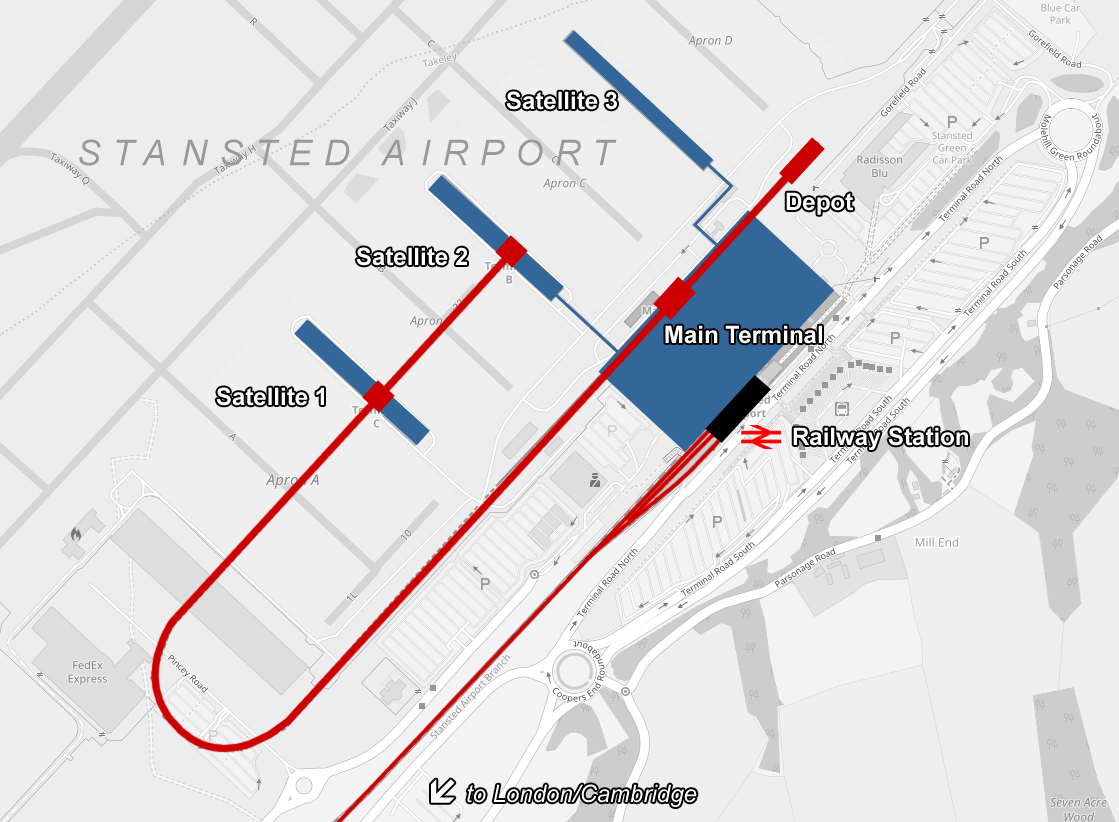
Map of the Stansted Transit System

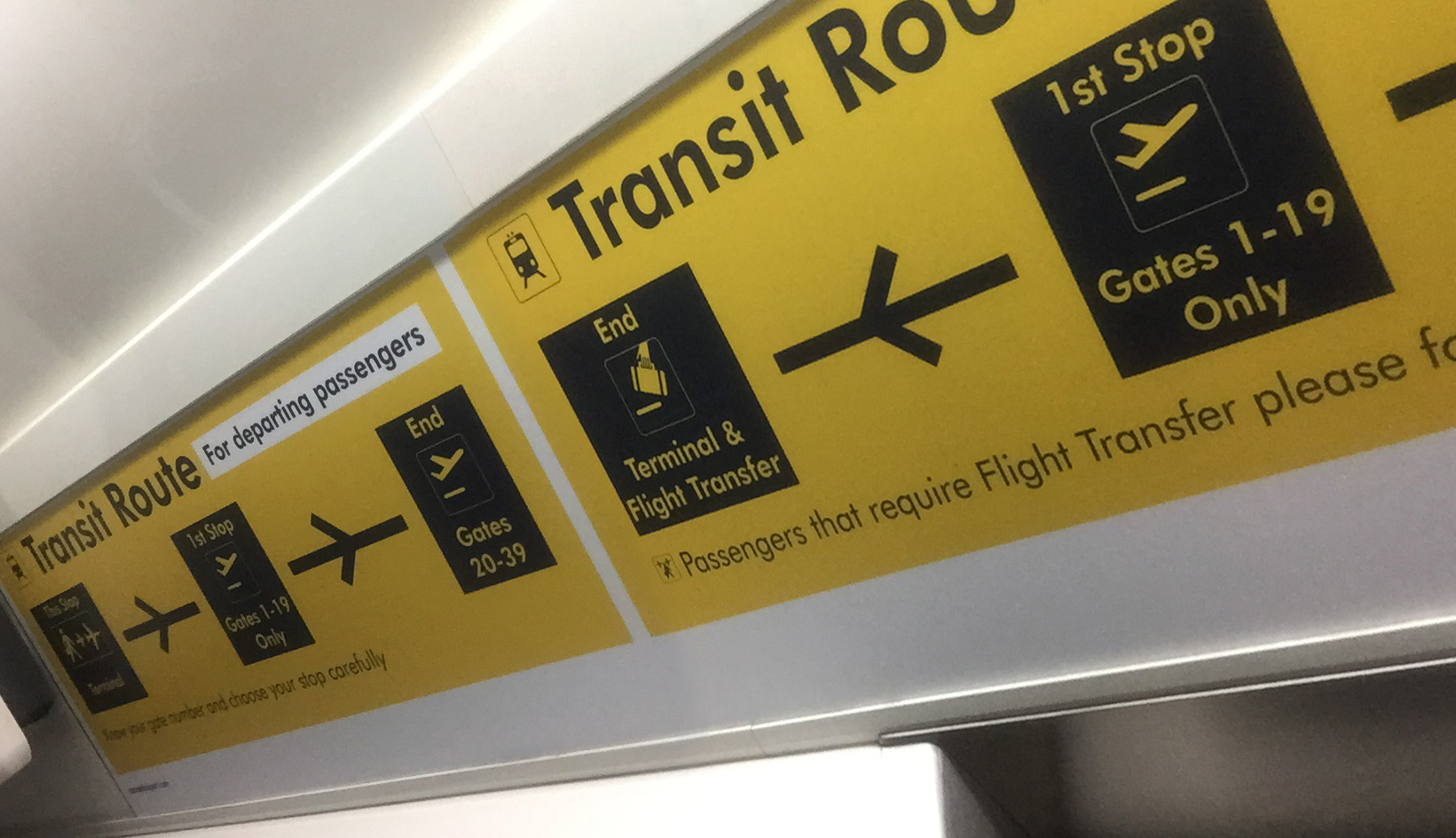
In-car route information signage

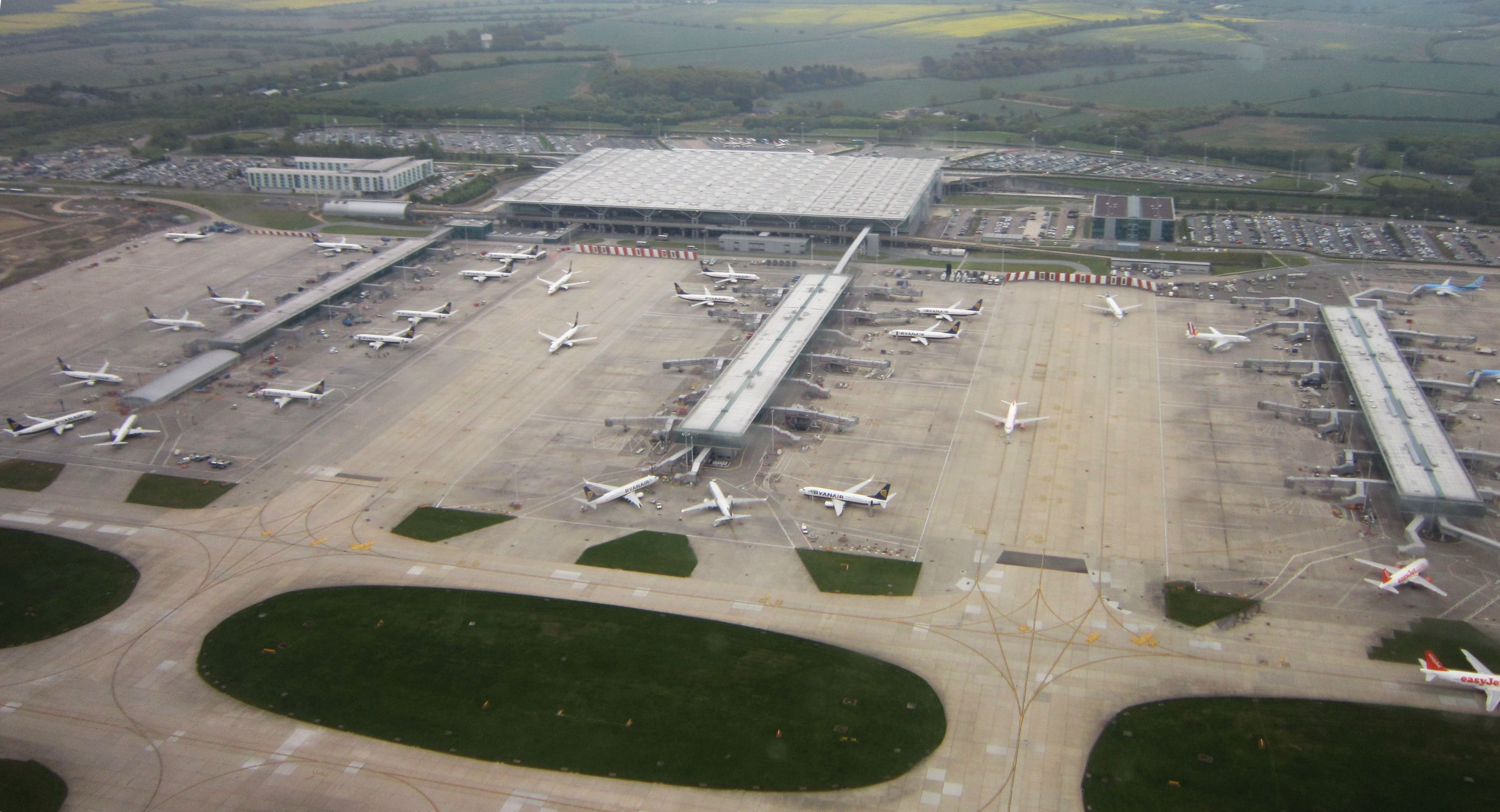
Aerial view of the airport, with the Transit line visible in front of the main terminal

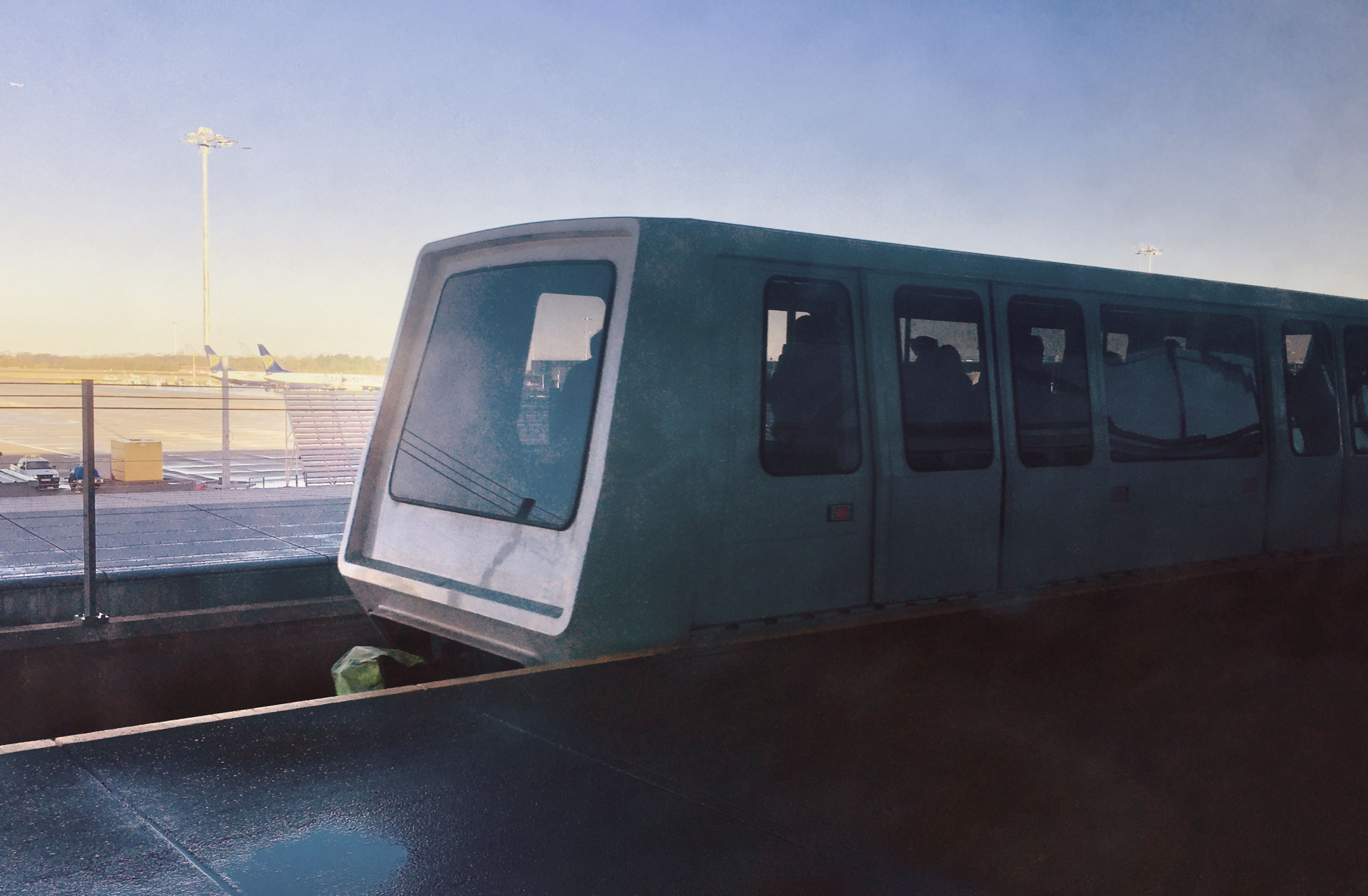
C-100 vehicle on elevated guideway section

== See also ==
- Gatwick Airport Shuttle Transit
- Heathrow Terminal 5 Transit
- Luton DART
