= Skyway (George Bush Intercontinental Airport) =

People mover system in Houston, Texas

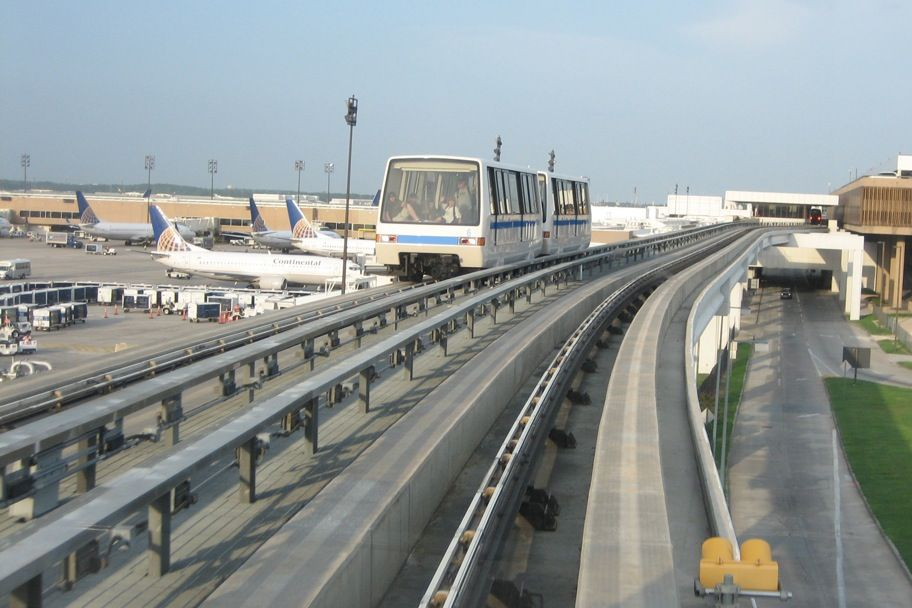
- Skyway train with original wrapping (TerminaLink)

Overview
- Status: Operational
- Locale: George Bush Intercontinental Airport, Houston, Texas
- Coordinates: 29.98657°N 95.34344°W
- Termini: Terminal A (west); Terminal D / E (east)
- Stations: 4

Service
- Type: People mover
- Operator(s): Johnson Controls Inc. (1999-2021); Alstom (2021)
- Rolling stock: 12 Innovia APM 100 vehicles
- Daily ridership: 10,000

History
- Opened: May 24, 1999

Technical
- Line length: 0.7 mi (1.1 km)
- Number of tracks: 2
- Character: Elevated
- Electrification: Third rail
- Operating speed: 30 mph (48 km/h)

Skyway (formerly TerminaLink) is an automated people mover system operating at George Bush Intercontinental Airport in Houston, Texas. The system is 0.7 miles (1.1 km) long, and runs along the north side of the airport, beyond airport security. The system serves all of the airport's five terminals, with four stations at Terminal A, Terminal B, Terminal C, and International Terminal D/E, respectively. Skyway, which operates airside, is one of two people movers currently operating at Bush Intercontinental Airport. The other people mover, which operates landside, opened in 1969 and is known as the Subway.

The system uses Innovia APM 100 vehicles, which are powered from a 600-volt third rail. There are a total of 12 vehicles in the system, and each vehicle travels at 30 mph (50 km/h) and can hold up to 80 passengers. The same type of vehicles are also found at Denver International Airport (Automated Guideway Transit System), Hartsfield-Jackson Atlanta International Airport (The Plane Train), San Francisco International Airport (AirTrain), and Tampa International Airport.

== History ==
The TerminaLink system opened on May 24, 1999 as a 0.1 mile (0.2 km) line with two stations, connecting Terminal C and Terminal B with a maintenance building for the rail vehicles between the two terminals. The system was funded by Continental Airlines at a cost of US $58 million, and was built to provide easy access between the airline's two airport terminals. Construction was completed in a total of 30 months and was the last phase of Continental's US$200 million airport expansion project.

In 2001, the system was expanded 0.6 mile (0.9 km) from Terminal C to Terminal D. The electrical work for the expansion was supervised by TAG Electric Company who installed over 71 miles (114 km) of cables and wires for the project.

The airport has expanded the line to Terminal A at a cost of US$100 million, and construction began in early 2008 and was completed in 2010. English onboard announcements are recorded by voice actor Gabe Doran.

In 2015, the airport updated its branding. As part of the initiative, TerminaLink and the Inter-terminal Train were renamed to Skyway and Subway, respectively. The new names refer to each APM's location; Skyway is the elevated track, while Subway is underground. This was intended to make it easier for travelers to differentiate the two lines. Skyway vehicles also received blue and green body wraps with the new name.

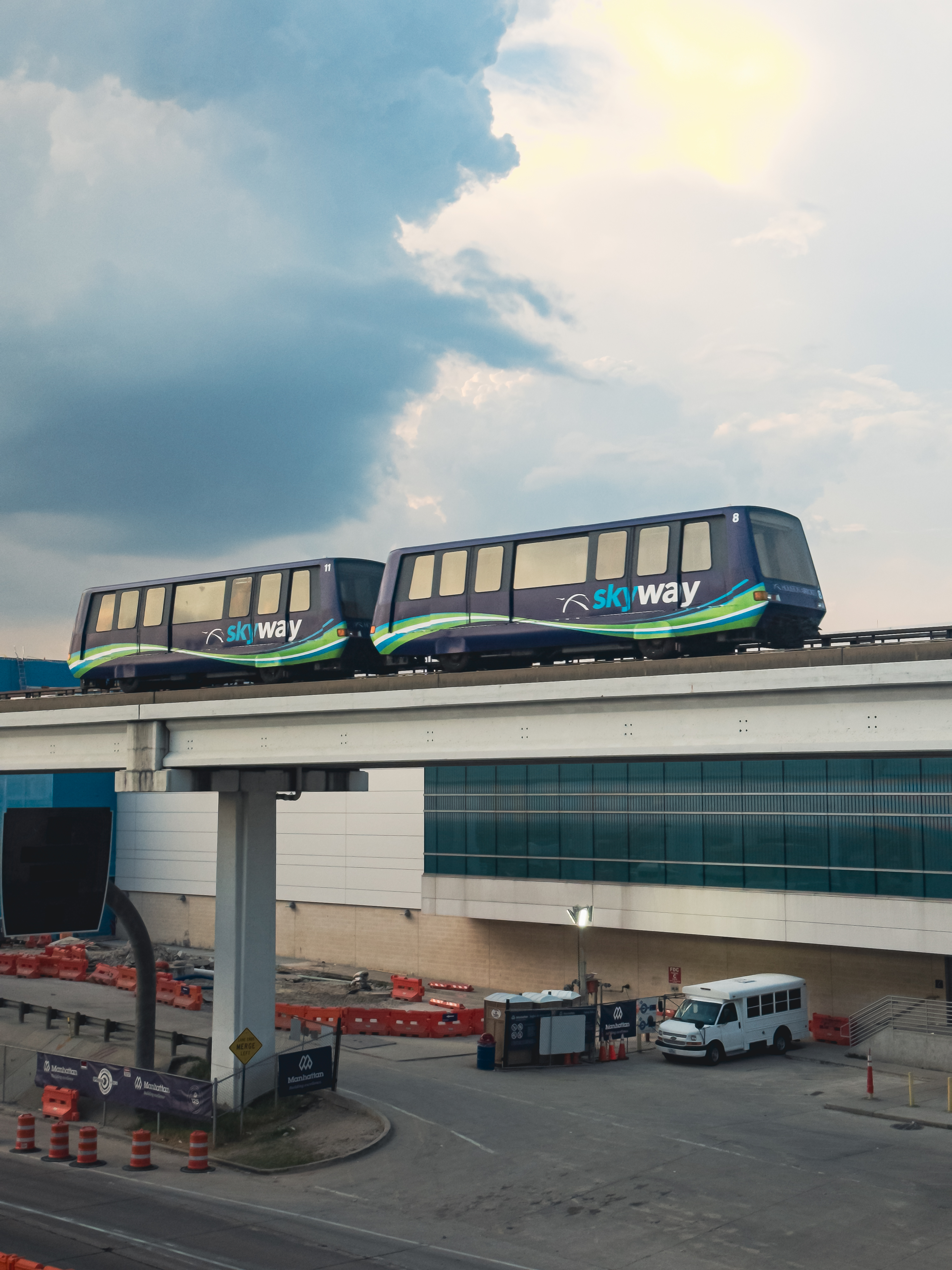
The Skyway at the George Bush Intercontinental Airport.

== See also ==
- List of airport people mover systems
