= Innovia APM 100 =

Automated people mover manufactured by Bombardier

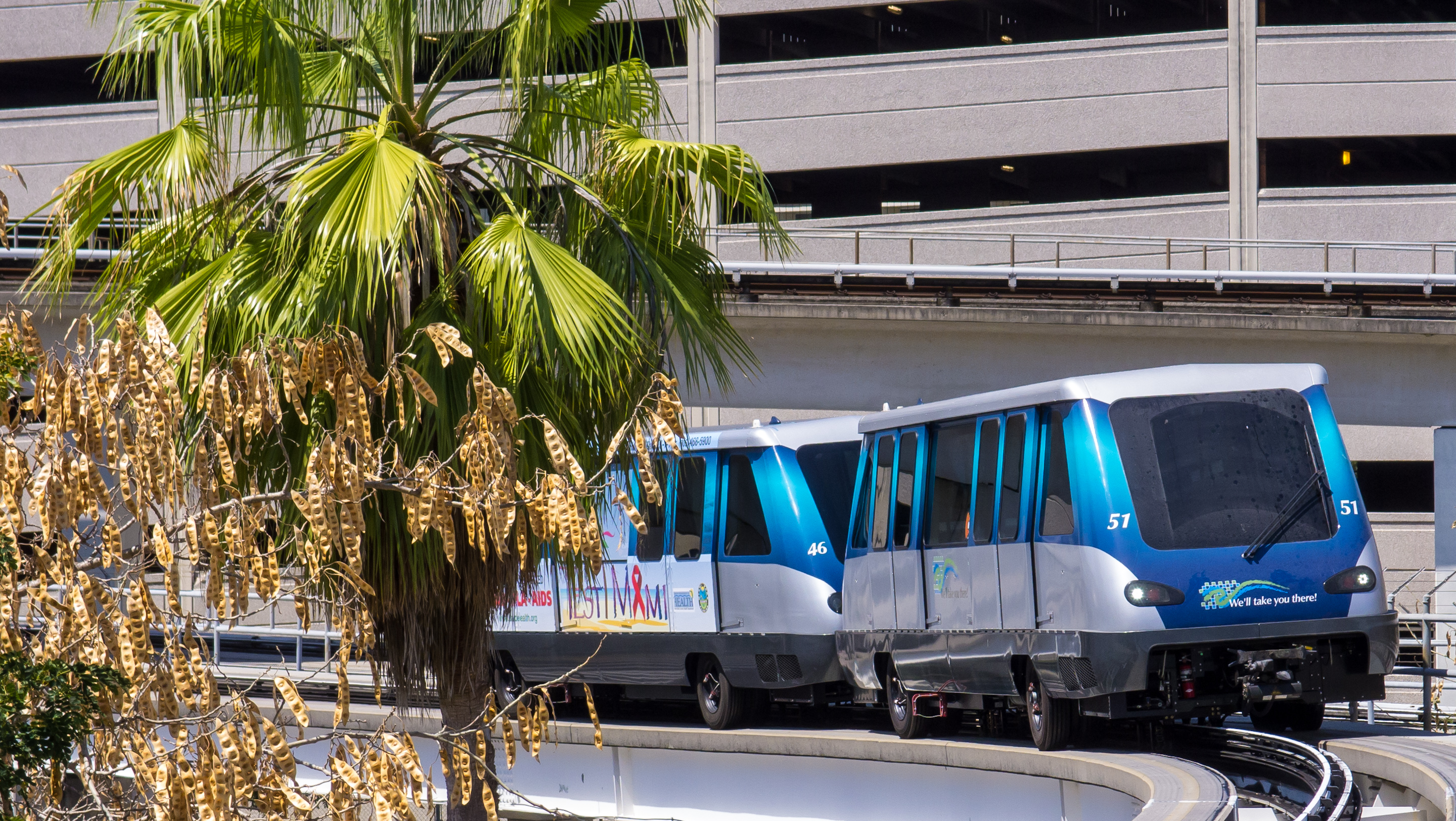
Innovia APM 100 vehicles on the Metromover in Miami

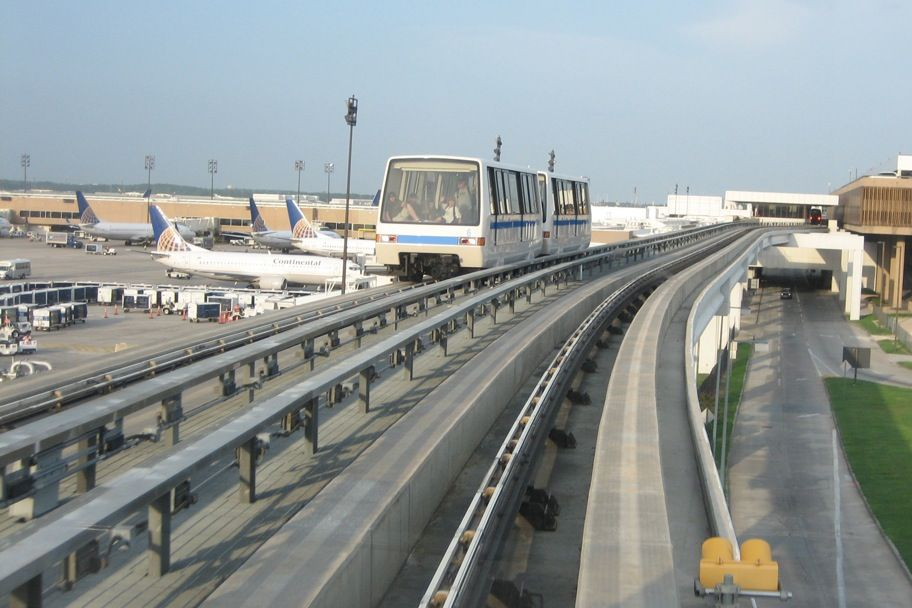
Skyway train at George Bush Intercontinental Airport

The Innovia APM 100 (formerly known as the CX-100) is an automated people mover (APM) rolling stock first developed by Westinghouse (later Adtranz, Bombardier Transportation and now Alstom), intended mainly for airport connections and light rail in towns. They are operated by Automatic Train Control (ATC), making it fully automatic and driverless.

The Innovia APM 100 is an evolution of Westinghouse's previous people mover vehicle, the C-100. Bombardier's intended successor to the Innovia APM 100 is the Innovia APM 200 (originally simply known as the Innovia), which made its debut on Dallas-Fort Worth International Airport's Skylink APM. However, the Innovia APM 100 continues to be offered by Bombardier and will remain in service at many airports for years to come. In addition to being used at many airports, the Innovia APM 100 is used on the Miami Metromover which runs throughout Downtown Miami, Florida, United States.

== History ==
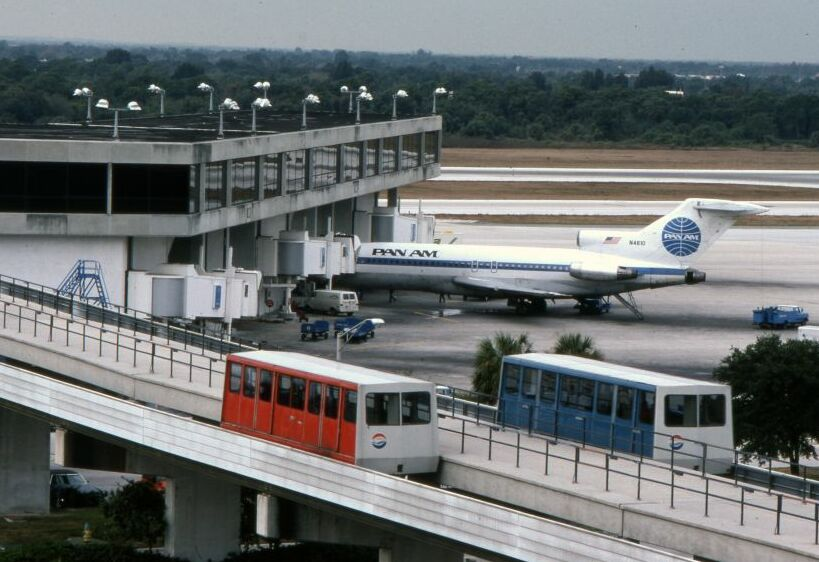
First-generation C-100 vehicles operating at Tampa International Airport in 1982

The Innovia 100 APM people mover vehicle is a modern version of the Westinghouse C-100 people mover first built by the Westinghouse Electric Corporation. Westinghouse developed the technology in the early 1960s. They built the Transit Expressway Revenue Line in Pittsburgh, Pennsylvania as a prototype to demonstrate their people mover technology in 1965. Westinghouse marketed the people mover system as an urban transit system and had hoped to build a fully-functioning system in Pittsburgh. However, political leaders held opposing views on the prospects of a rubber-tired mass transit system and plans to implement this system were rejected.

Despite this, Westinghouse would see success with their people mover system at airports. In 1966, they were contracted to build a people mover system for the new terminal at Tampa International Airport. This would be the first time an automated people mover system was used to transport passengers within an airport terminal. The Tampa airport system included eight first-generation Westinghouse C-100 vehicles when it opened in 1971. Two years later, Westinghouse completed its second airport people mover system, the Satellite Transit System, at Seattle-Tacoma International Airport.

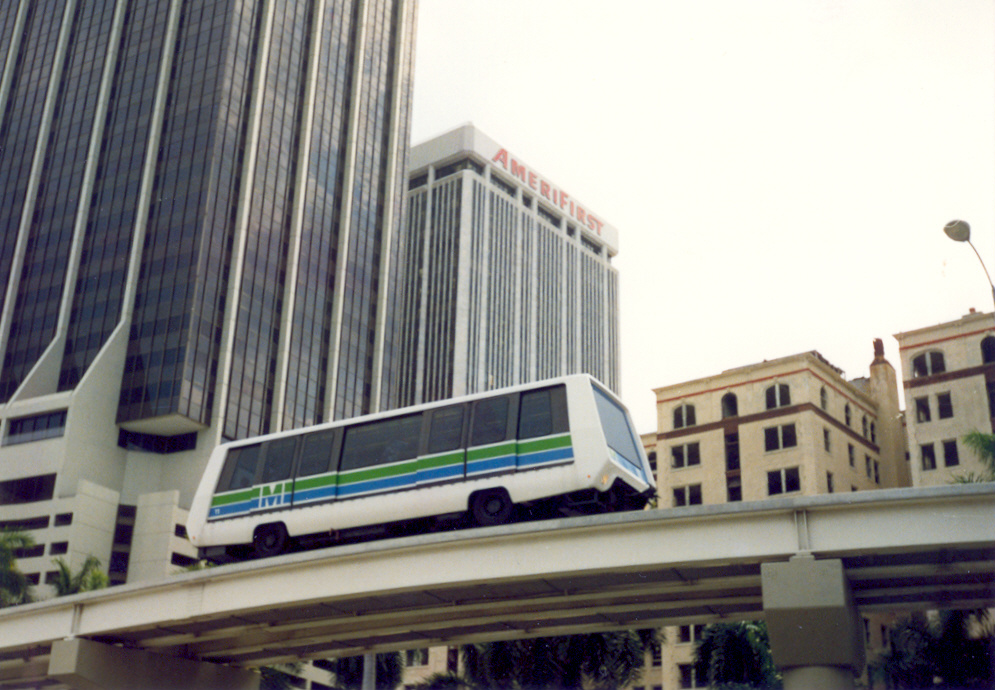
A Westinghouse second-generation C-100 on Miami's Metromover train in its original livery

In 1980, Westinghouse people mover systems were opened at Miami International Airport and Hartsfield Atlanta International Airport. The system in Atlanta (known today as The Plane Train), is one of the world's most heavily used people mover systems in the world. These systems used second generation C-100 vehicles, which has been the primary design of the vehicle ever since. The C-100 would be installed at more airports throughout the 1980s.

In 1986, the Westinghouse C-100 made its debut on its first urban people mover system, the Metromover in Miami, Florida.

In 1988, Westinghouse sold its transportation division to West German company AEG, which merged into a joint venture of ABB and Daimler Benz named Adtranz in 1996. Adtranz continued production on the C-100, which was marketed as the Adtranz C-100 and subsequently the Adtranz CX-100.

Adtranz was acquired by Bombardier in 2001, who then rebranded the vehicle as the Bombardier CX-100. Bombardier has since rebranded the CX-100 again to its current name, the Innovia APM 100, to bring all of their people mover models under the same branding.

While most of the earlier C-100s have been retired and replaced with Innovia APM 100s, London Stansted Airport still uses 5 C-100 vehicles on its Track Transit System; however, that system is expected to be decommissioned in 2026. 4 C-100s are also preserved on display in museums: 2 vehicles from the Miami Metromover are preserved at the Gold Coast Railroad Museum and 2 from the Hartsfield-Jackson Atlanta International Airport system are preserved at the Southeastern Railway Museum.

== Airport connections ==
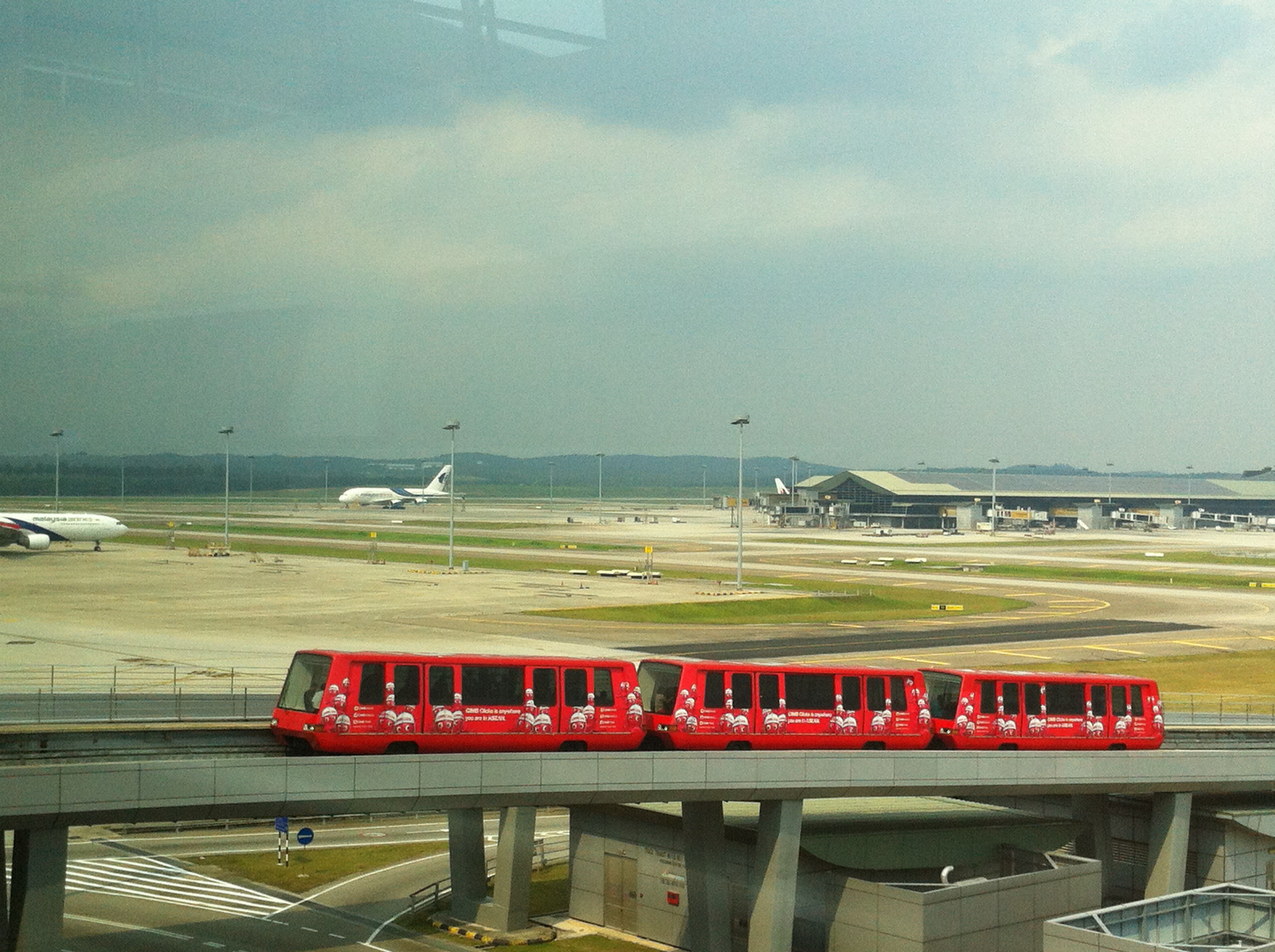
Former Innovia APM 100 operating on AeroTrain at Kuala Lumpur International Airport

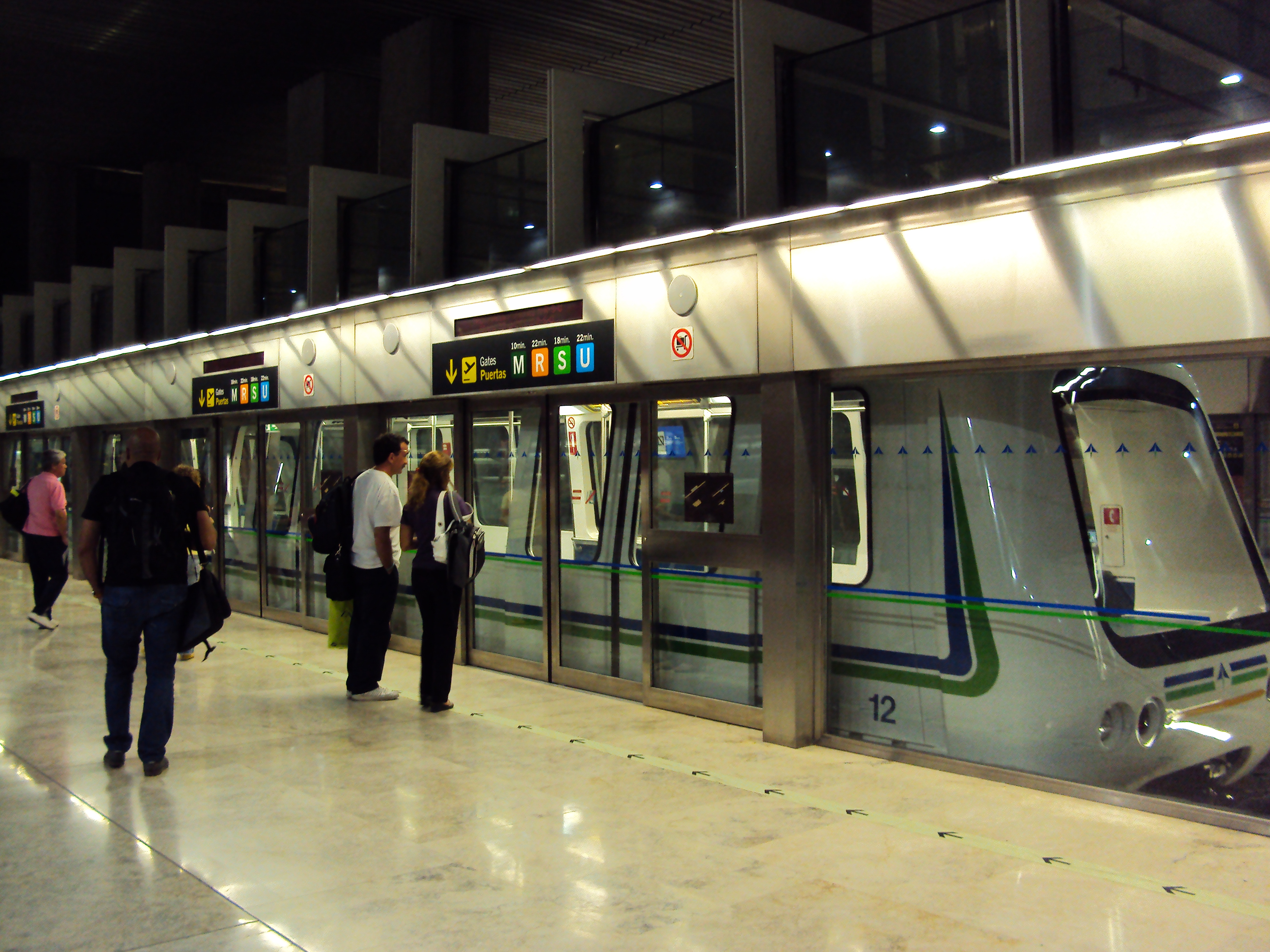
The automatic people mover of Adolfo Suárez Madrid–Barajas Airport

A popular rolling stock for intra-terminal connection in large airports, it operates in a number of airports:

Airport	System	Opened	Notes
Adolfo Suárez Madrid–Barajas Airport	Airport People Mover	2006	
Beijing Capital International Airport	Terminal 3 People Mover	2008	
Changi Airport (Singapore)	Changi Airport Skytrain	1990	Original 2nd Gen C-100s were replaced by Mitsubishi Crystal Movers in 2006.
Denver International Airport	Automated Guideway Transit System	1993/95	14 of the original 2nd Gen C-100s continue to operate with the CX-100s.
Frankfurt Airport (Frankfurt, Germany)	SkyLine	1994	
George Bush Intercontinental Airport (Houston, Texas)	Skyway	1999	
Harry Reid International Airport (Las Vegas, Nevada)	Harry Reid International Airport Automated People Movers	1985/1998/2012	Original C-100s replaced with Innovia APM 100s in 2009.
Hartsfield-Jackson Atlanta International Airport	The Plane Train	1980	Original 2nd Gen C-100s were replaced with CX-100s in between 1997 & 2001. However, only a few still remain in service.
Kuala Lumpur International Airport	AeroTrain	1998	Original 2nd Gen C-100s were replaced with Innovia APM 300.
Leonardo da Vinci Airport (Rome, Italy)	SkyBridge	1999	
London Gatwick Airport	Tracked Shuttle System	1987	Original 2nd Gen C-100s replaced with Innovia APM 100s in 2009.
London Stansted Airport	Track Transit System	1991	Operates with a combination of 5 2nd Gen C-100s and 4 Innovia APM 100s.
Miami International Airport	Concourse E People Mover	1980	System decommissioned in 2016. Replaced with a MiniMetro system by Leitner-Poma in 2016.
Orlando International Airport	Orlando International Airport People Movers	1981	Airsides 2 & 4 only. Airsides 1 & 3's original Westinghouse 2nd Gen C-100 were replaced by Mitsubishi Crystal Movers in 2017. Airsides 2 & 4's fleet will be replaced by 2027.
Pittsburgh International Airport	Pittsburgh International Airport People Movers	1992	System was closed on November 18, 2025.
Sacramento International Airport	SMF Automated People Mover	2011	
San Francisco International Airport	AirTrain	2003	
Seattle-Tacoma International Airport	SEA Underground	1973	Original 1st Gen C-100s replaced by Innovia APM 100s in 2003.
Tampa International Airport	Tampa International Airport People Movers	1971	Original 1st Gen C-100s replaced with Innovia APM 100s in 1995.

== Urban lines ==
=== Miami Metromover ===
The Bombardier Innovia APM 100 is used on the Metromover in Miami, Florida, United States. This was the first application of Westinghouse's people mover technology outside of an airport. The system's original Westinghouse C-100s were replaced with the current Innovia APM 100s in 2008. The Metromover remains one of the world's few rail systems that uses the Innovia APM 100 for non-airport operations.

=== Bukit Panjang LRT ===
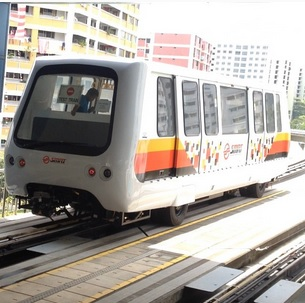
A Bombardier Innovia APM 100 train on the Bukit Panjang LRT Line

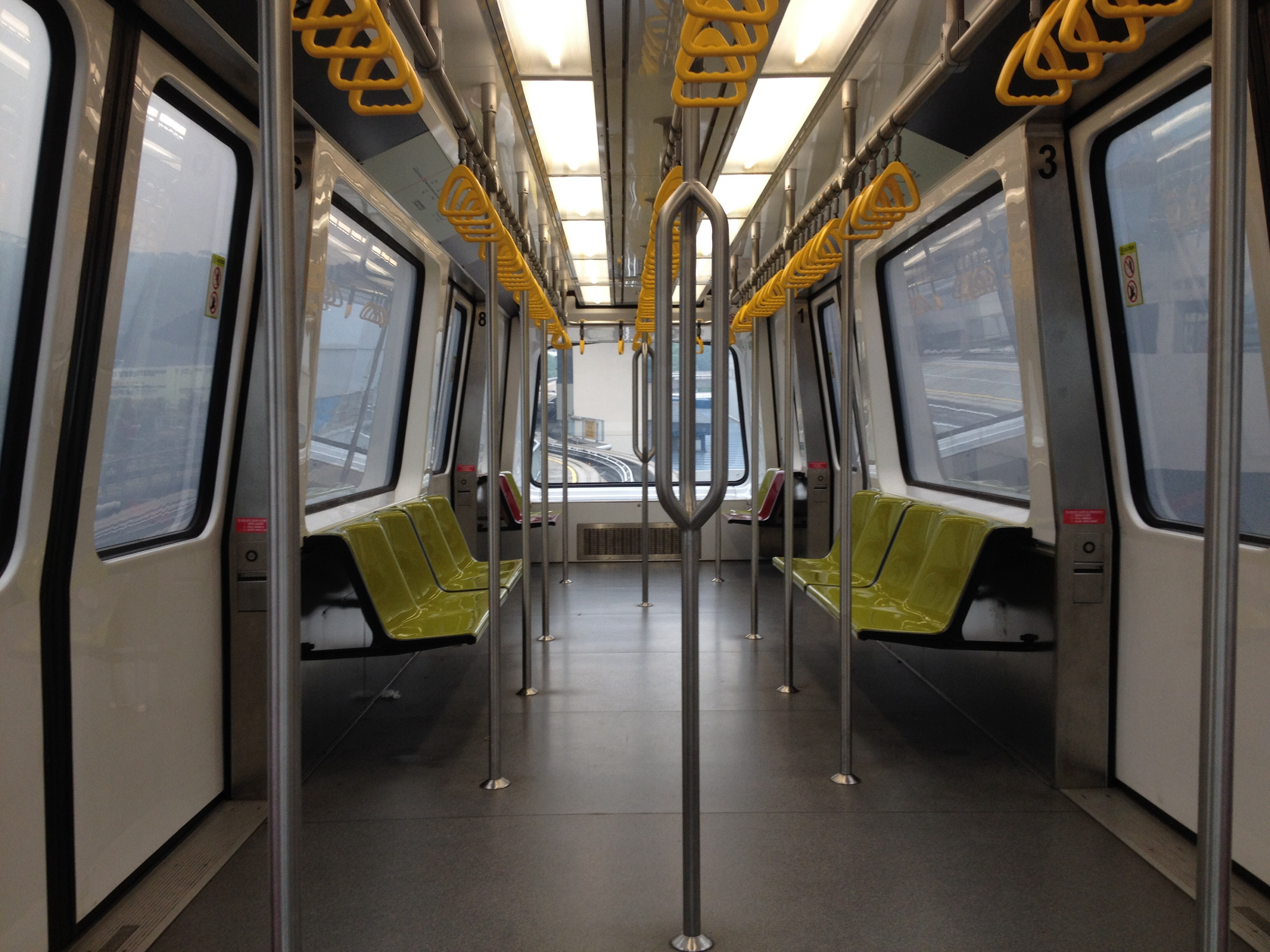
Interior of a new Innovia APM 100 car on the Bukit Panjang LRT

The Innovia APM 100 (C801) began operations on the Bukit Panjang LRT Line in 1999. These cars are similar to the C-100s formerly used at Singapore Changi Airport's Skytrain system in the early 1990s, jointly built by Westinghouse and Adtranz (acquired by Bombardier). Most of the new features available in newer MRT train cars are found here as well.

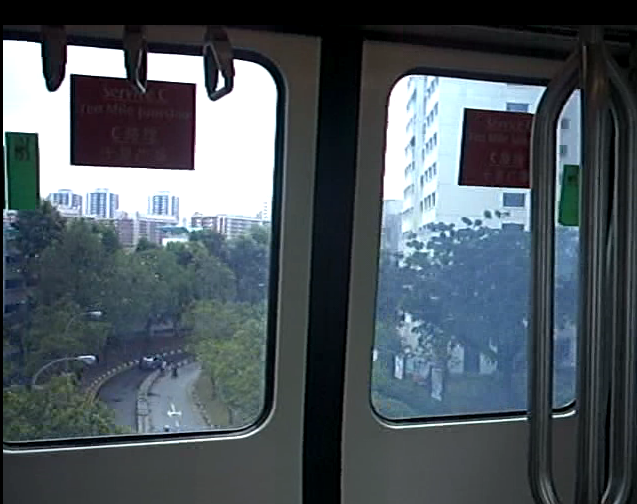
Bukit Panjang LRT's windows when not 'misted'

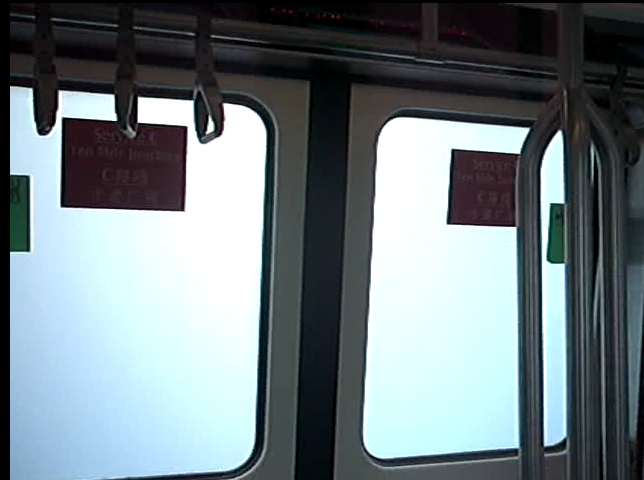
Bukit Panjang LRT's windows when 'misted', to prevent passengers from peering into apartments as the trains pass by

Instead of metal wheels on metal tracks, rubber-tired wheels on a concrete track are used, which makes it run very quietly. The windows are smart glass and are programmed to automatically mist within 6 metres (20 ft) of (mostly) HDB apartment blocks ensuring residents' privacy. 19 individual cars (which can be coupled in pairs if necessary during peak hours) were purchased.

The line suffered numerous technical problems in its initial years, and subsequent LRT lines in Singapore used the Crystal Mover instead. SMRT also announced that they will upgrade the LRT system with full cost paid by the company.

13 more trainsets for the Bukit Panjang LRT Line (C801A) have been progressively introduced since late-2014 to ease the 100% peak hour congestion. As of 4 September 2015, all C801A trains are on revenue service.

=== Guangzhou APM Line ===
The Zhujiang New Town Automated People Mover System, or officially known as the Guangzhou Metro APM Line, is operated by a fleet of 14 Innovia APM 100 rolling stock. It serves the Zhujiang New Town area in Guangzhou, the new CBD of the city. The system began operations in November 2010 and is completely underground. In terms of construction cost per kilometre, it is the most expensive APM system in the world, yet it is the shortest and least used line in the Guangzhou Metro network.

== Technical specifications ==
- System operation: Automatic train control (ATC) under automatic train operation (ATO) GoA level 4 (UTO)
  - CITYFLO 550 fixed block signalling
  - CITYFLO 650 moving block communications-based train control (CBTC)
- Gauge: 2,642-millimetre (8 ft 8 in) central guideway with rubber tyres
- Maximum speed: 55 kilometres per hour (34 mph) (Guangzhou Metro variation: 60 kilometres per hour (37 mph))
- Traction control: Thyristor drive powering two Bombardier 1460-P4 DC motors, each with a continuous rating of 75 kW (101 hp)
- Capacity: 105 (22 seating, 83 standing)
- Unladen weight: 15 tonnes (15 long tons; 17 short tons)
- Dimensions: 12.8 metres (41 ft 11 7/8 in) long, 2.8 metres (9 ft 2 1/4 in) wide, 3.4 metres (11 ft 1 7/8 in) high

== See also ==
- Bombardier Guided Light Transit
- Innovia APM – automated people mover systems
- Crystal Mover – a competing APM rolling stock by Mitsubishi Heavy Industries
