= SEA Underground =

People mover system at Seattle–Tacoma International Airport

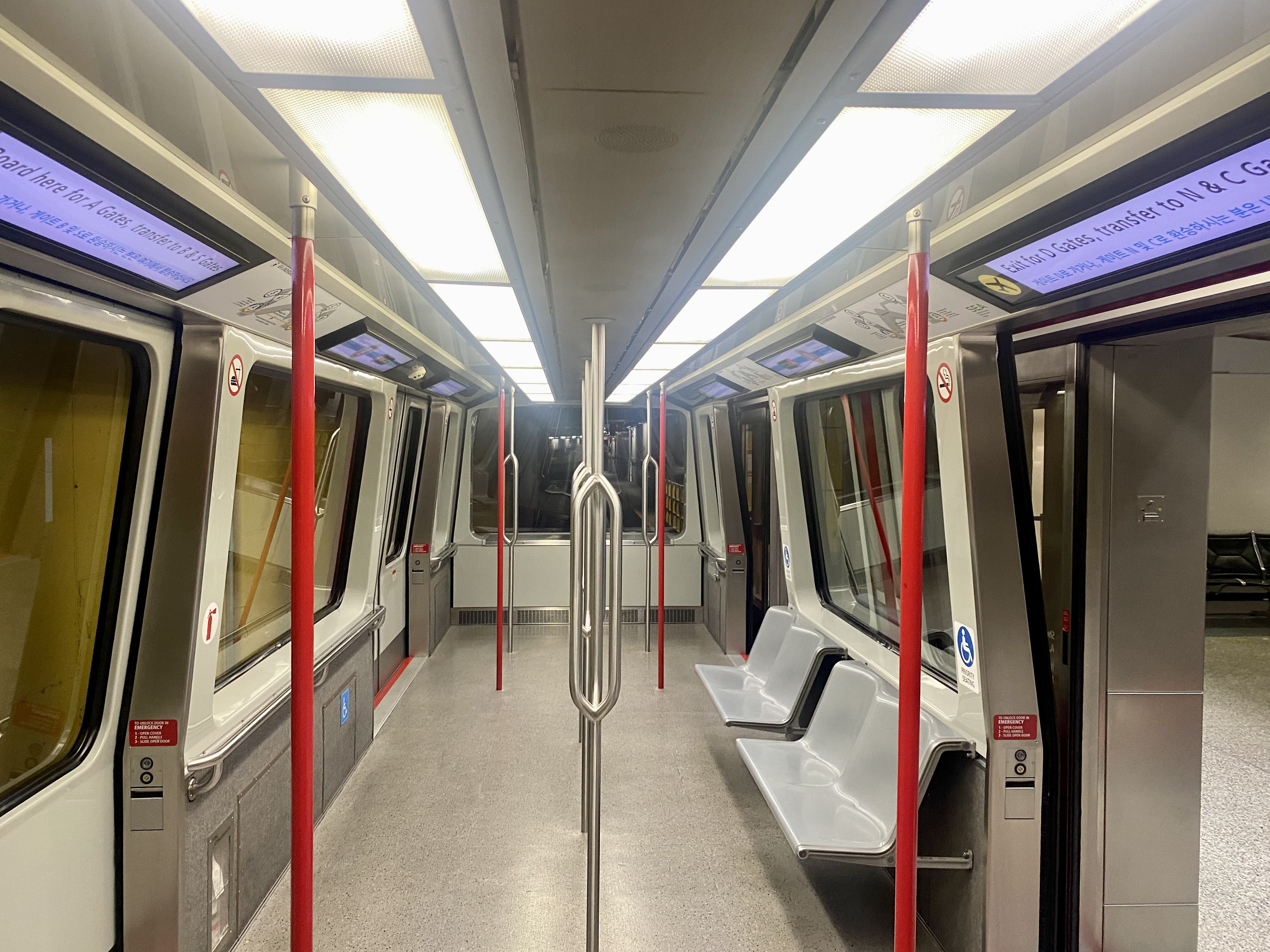
- Interior of a Innovia APM 100 car used on the SEA Underground, refurbished with color displays

Overview
- Owner: Port of Seattle
- Locale: Seattle–Tacoma International Airport
- Stations: 6

Service
- Type: People mover
- Services: 3
- Rolling stock: 21 Innovia APM 100 vehicles
- Ridership: 16 million (2015)

History
- Opened: July 1973

Technical
- Line length: 1.67 mi (2.69 km)
- Number of tracks: 1
- Character: Underground
- Operating speed: 27 mph (43 km/h)
Route map
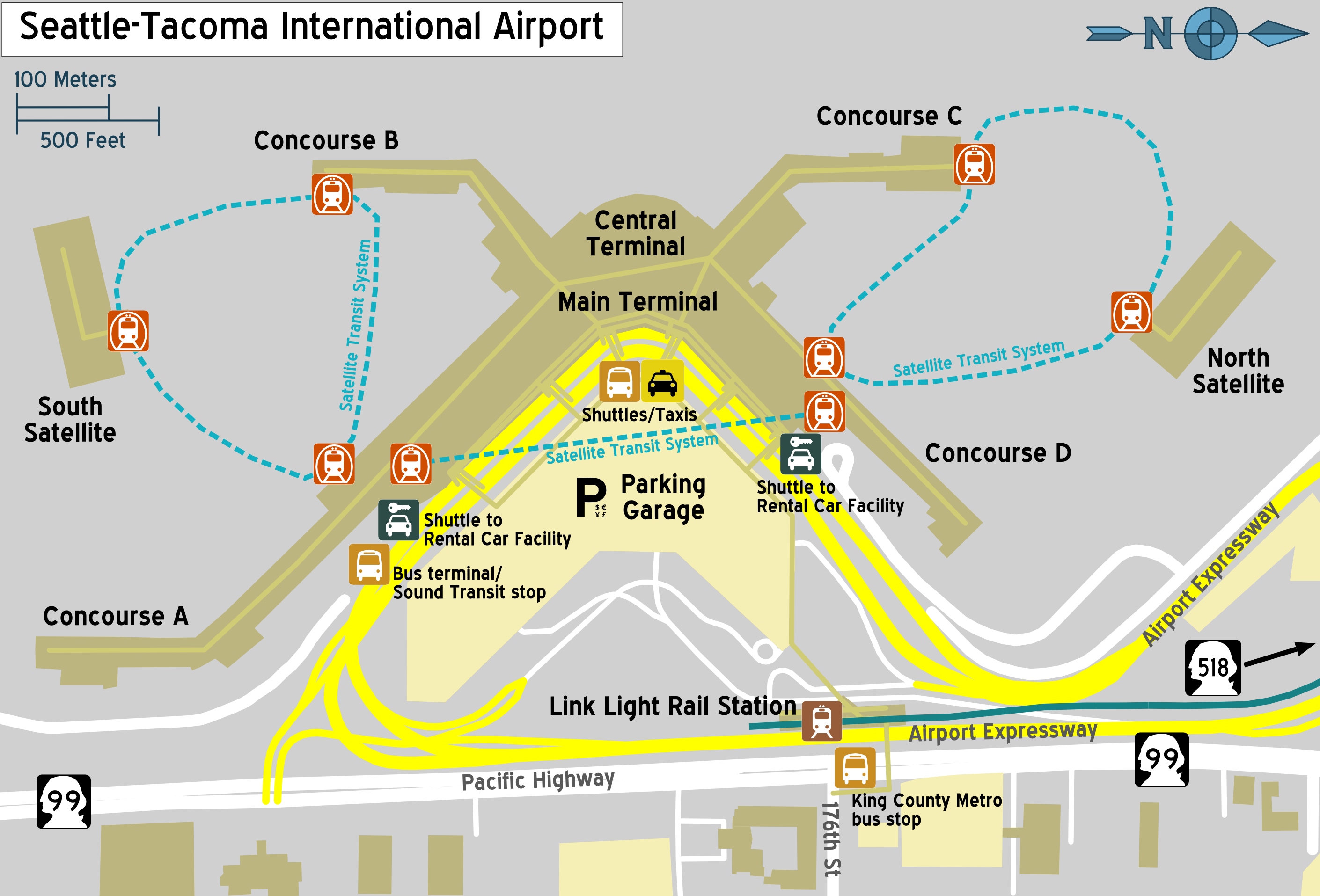

The SEA Underground, formerly called the Satellite Transit System (STS), is an automated people mover (APM) system operating in the Seattle–Tacoma International Airport in SeaTac, Washington, United States. Originally opening in 1973, the SEA Underground is one of the oldest airport people mover systems in the world. It was designed to quickly transport passengers to and from the North and South Satellites, and around the airport's Main Terminal.

== History ==
The system was approved for construction in 1969, to be built alongside the new satellite terminals as the first inter-terminal train system in the United States. It was completed in 1972 at a cost of $5 million and opened to the public in July 1973. That makes it the second oldest airport people mover system in the United States (after Tampa International Airport). The opening was delayed due to a dispute between the Port of Seattle and Westinghouse, the manufacturer of the system, over contracted costs.

The system opened in 1973 at a total cost of $14 million. The original system consisted of nine vehicles; an additional three were added in the mid-1970s. The system was designed to have a capacity of 14,400 passengers per hour and travel at a maximum speed of 27 miles per hour (43 km/h).

The original C-100 vehicles were built by Westinghouse and had a maximum capacity of 102 passengers. The average travel time for the two loops was 3.3 minutes, and 1.8 minutes on the shuttle, and each vehicle was estimated to amass 47,000 miles (76,000 km) annually.

In 1999, the Port of Seattle authorized $142 million to completely overhaul the entire SEA Underground system. The overhaul included all aspects of the system including trains, controls, power supplies, stations, emergency ventilation systems and maintenance shops. The upgrade and modernization was completed in 2003. The line now uses Innovia APM 100 vehicles (a modernized version of the original C-100 vehicles) with the Cityflo 650 CBTC (communications-based train control) system for its automated operation.

The Port of Seattle renamed the system to SEA Underground in March 2022 and assigned new names to the lines using colors: Green Line, Blue Line, and Yellow Line. Those colors were also added on the walls next to and behind the station doors.

== Layout and operation ==
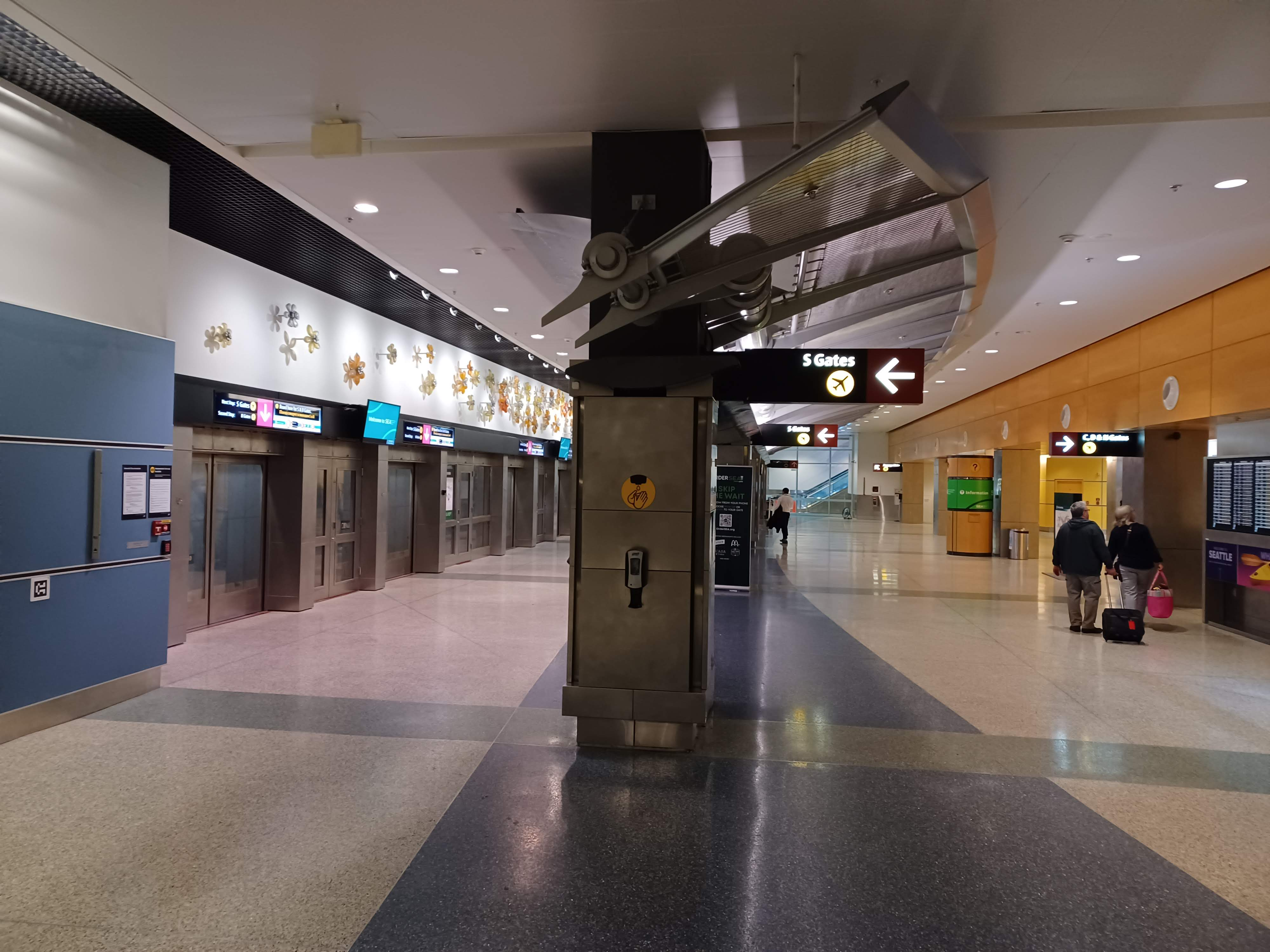
Main Terminal South station, showing the color-coded Blue Line boarding area on the left and the Yellow Line on the right

SEA Underground is located within secure areas of the airport. The system consists of six stations serving each of the four gate concourses extending from the main terminal (Concourses A, B, C and D), and the North and South Satellite terminals. Each station is equipped with platform edge doors. The system consists of two loops serving the satellite terminals and a third line connecting the two loops in the main terminal.

- The Green Line (North Train Loop) is 4,100 feet (1,200 m) in length and has stations in the north end of the Main Terminal (near Concourse D), Concourse C and the North Satellite (N gates).
- The Blue Line (South Train Loop) is 3,700 feet (1,100 m) in length and has stations in the south end of the Main Terminal (near Concourse A), Concourse B and the South Satellite (S gates).
- The Yellow Line (Shuttle Train between A and D Stations) is 1,000 feet (300 m) in length and has stations at both the north end of the Main Terminal (near the D Concourse) and the south end of the Main Terminal (near the A Concourse), and serves as a connection between the North and South Terminal Transit Loops.

The system has 21 APM vehicles, with about 13 in service at any given time: two 3-car trains on the Green and Blue Lines and a single car on the Yellow Line. Approximately 40 percent of Sea-Tac Airport passengers use the SEA Underground system. Maintenance is generally conducted on weekends after cars are moved into one of two shops via a lateral transfer table.

The system has a 99.9% uptime rate. When track maintenance is required on the Green and Blue Lines, the work is typically done overnight, and a single train operates in a shuttle mode. If the system experiences a loss of traction power, cars have enough power storage to allow them to reach the next station. While most APM systems are operated by the system builder, the Port of Seattle is one of the few owners that also operate and maintain their APM system. The Port estimates that this arrangement results in a 40% savings in maintenance costs.

== Public art ==
As part of its 2003 renovation, public art projects were included in the scope of the project. The main terminal's south station features a series of 56-plus flowers cast of aluminum and aluminum/resin mix created by Nancy Blum. In the main terminal's north station is a series of nine paintings created by Karen Ganz representing various travelers.

== See also ==
- List of airport people mover systems
