= Gatwick Airport Shuttle Transit =

Automated people mover linking terminals at Gatwick Airport

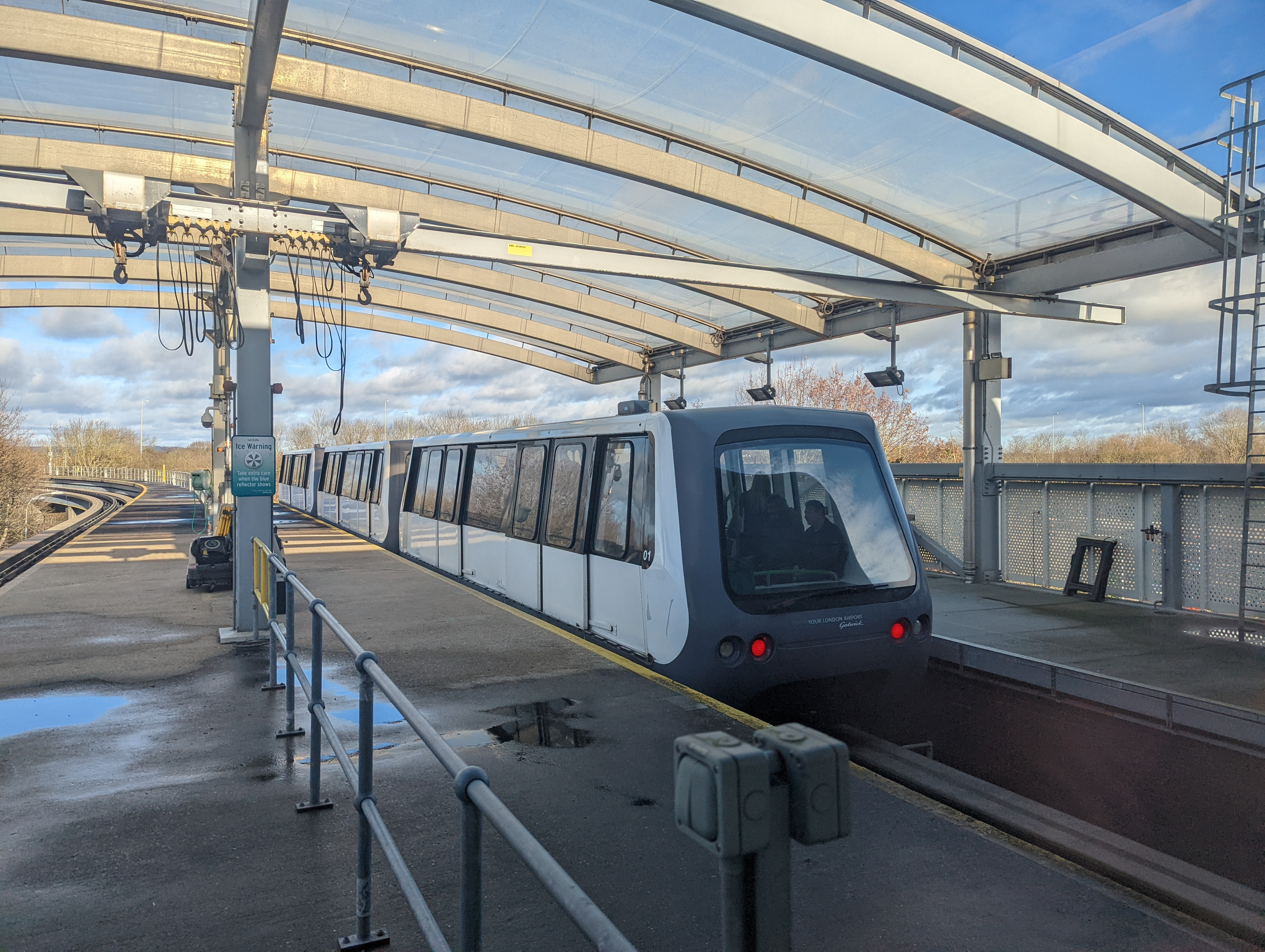
- The latest generation of rolling stock departing from the South Terminal

Overview
- Locale: Gatwick Airport
- Transit type: Automated people mover
- Number of lines: 1
- Number of stations: 2

Operation
- Began operation: 1987
- Character: Elevated
- Rolling stock: 6 × Bombardier Innovia APM 100
- Train length: 3 units

Technical
- System length: 3/4 mi (1.2 km)
- No. of tracks: 2

The Gatwick Airport Shuttle Transit is a 3/4-mile (1.2 km) long elevated automated people mover that links the North and South Terminals at London's Gatwick Airport. The line is ground-side, and besides linking the two terminals also serves to link the North terminal to the airport railway station. Although sometimes colloquially, but erroneously, known as a "monorail", the transit vehicles are carried on rubber tyres running on a concrete track with twin running surfaces and are steered by separate guide rails.

== History ==
Until 1987, Gatwick had a single main terminal, now known as the South Terminal. The first people mover was opened on 26 April 1983, running a short distance between the main South Terminal and a small circular satellite pier containing additional departure gates. This was the UK's first automated people-mover system. This system has since been replaced by a walkway-and-moving walkway link, although the remains of the elevated guideway are still visible; in the years since, they have been partially demolished to provide additional headroom to the airside service road below.

In 1987, the new North Terminal was opened. A longer-distance people mover was constructed to connect the new terminal to the existing South Terminal and the adjacent railway station, still in service today. The line initially used Adtranz C-100 people-mover cars, which remained in operation until September 2009, by which time they had travelled a total of 2.5 million miles (4 million km). Gatwick began upgrading its shuttle service in April 2008, with a bus replacement service in place from September 2009. A new operating system and shuttle cars (six Bombardier CX-100 vehicles) was installed, and the guideway and transit stations were refurbished at a total cost of £45 million. The system re-opened on 1 July 2010, two months ahead of schedule; it featured live journey information and sensory technology to count the number of passengers at stations.

== Operation ==
The transit has two parallel guideway tracks, running on a concrete elevated structure with an emergency walk-way between the tracks. There are enclosed stations at each terminal, which allow boarding from a central platform between the tracks while passengers disembark to platforms outside the tracks. Doors on the edges of each platform line up with the train's doors. There is no connection between the two tracks, each of which hosts a single three-car train shuttling backwards and forward. The line is automatic and driverless. The normal service uses both trains, with a departure from each terminal every 5 minutes and a 2 to 3 minute journey time. The service operates 24-hours a day, although service levels are reduced to every 10 minutes between 23:00 and 06:00, with only one of the two guideway tracks being used. No fares are charged.

== Gallery ==
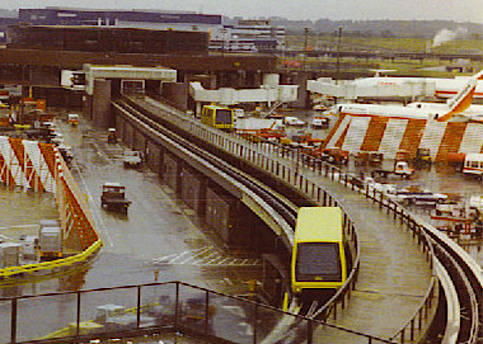
The early (and now defunct) line from South Terminal to Satellite in 1988

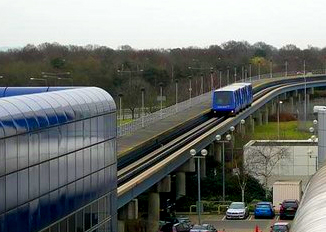
Train approaching North Terminal station in 2008; both train and station have since been replaced

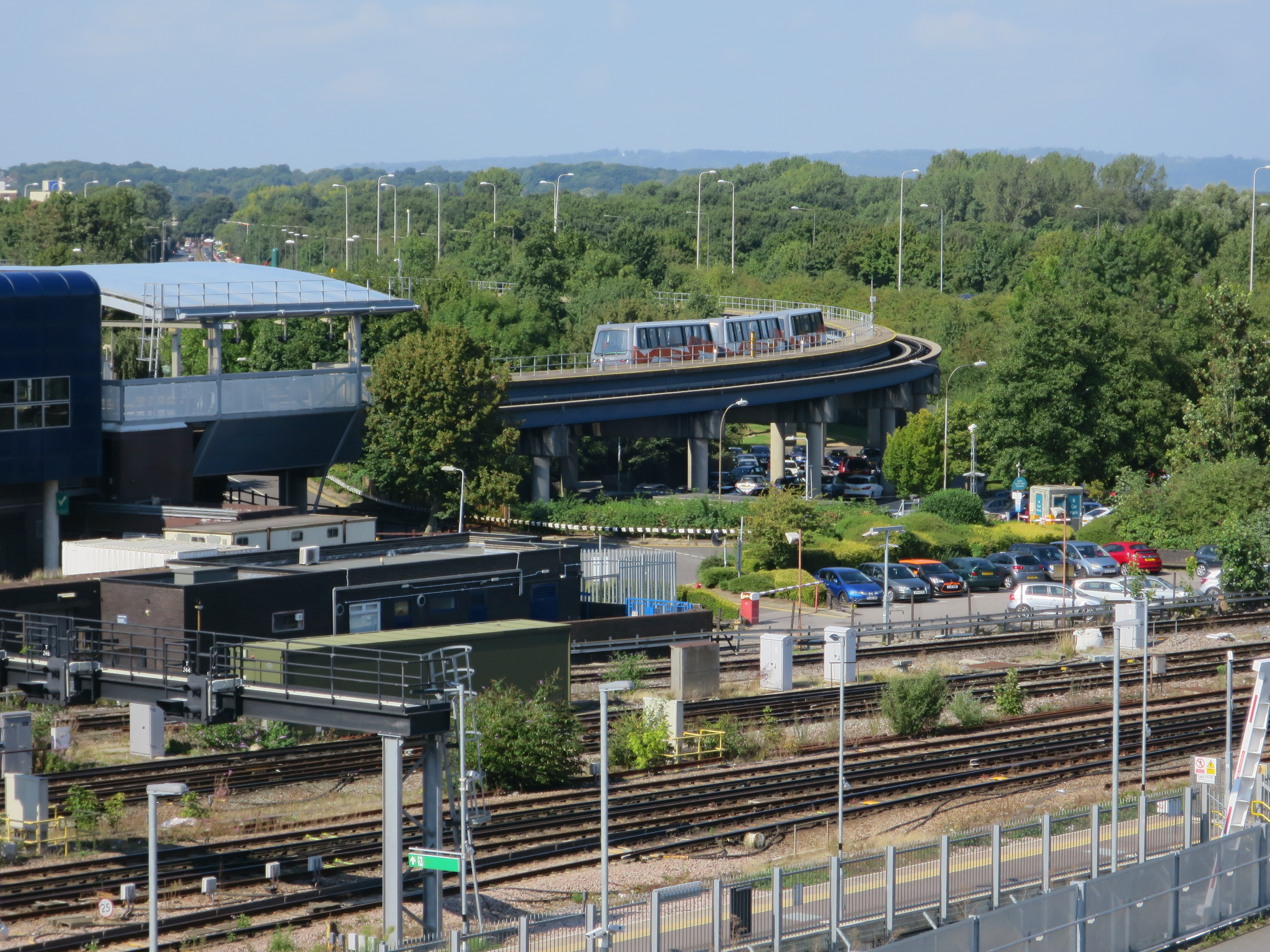
Shuttle Transit station and train at South Terminal in 2016 with railway tracks in foreground

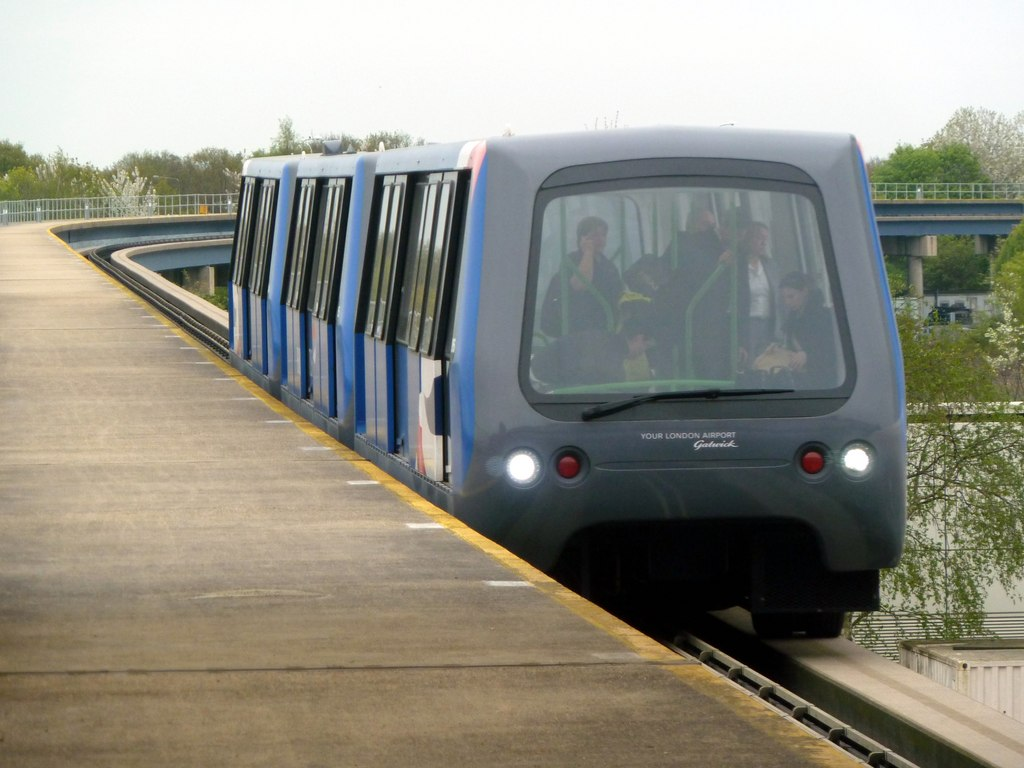
One of the latest trains on the guideway in 2011

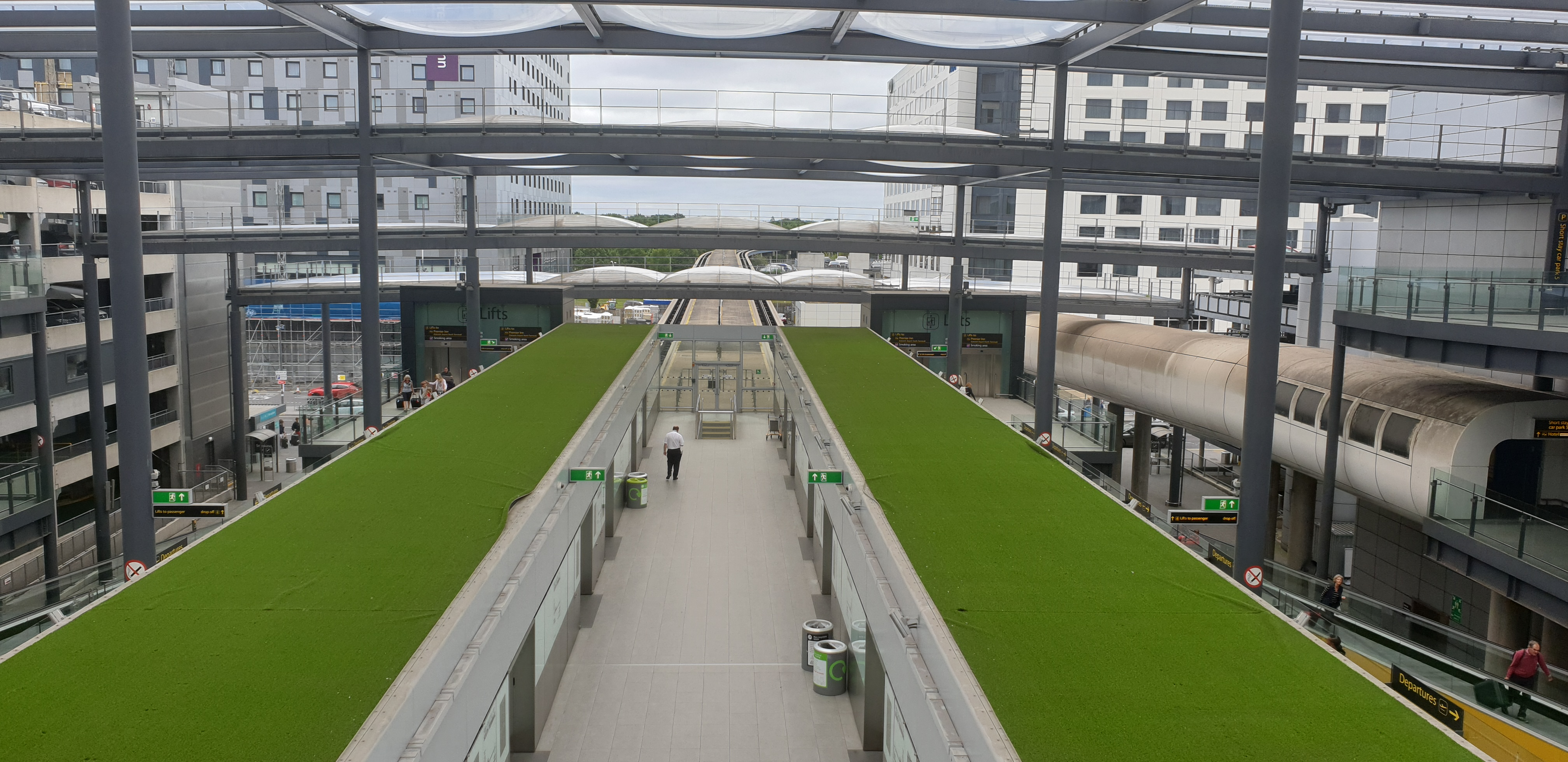
Shuttle Transit station at North Terminal in 2019 showing centre platform, platform doors and green roofs over tracks

South Terminal station, 2021

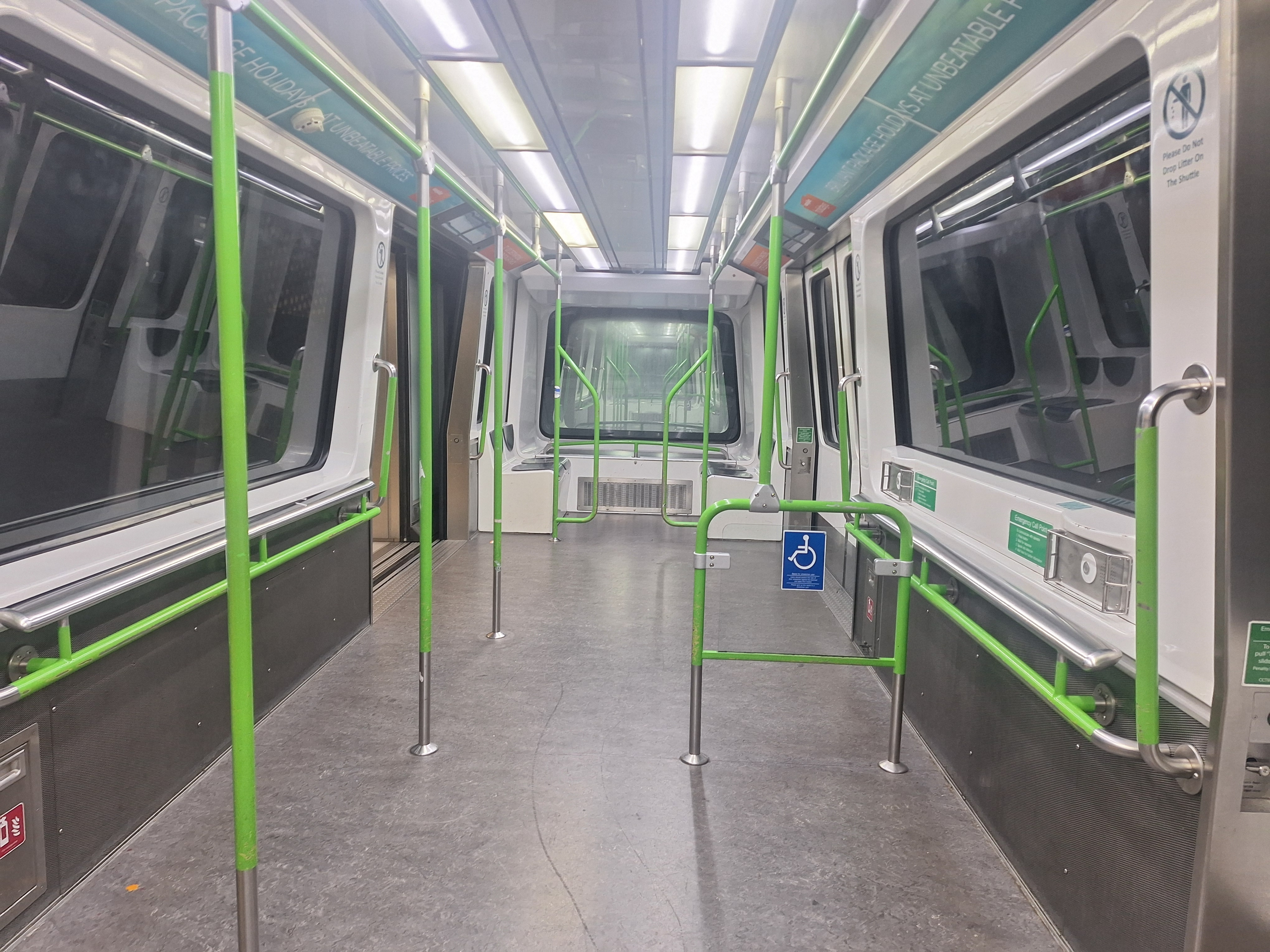
Interior of a Gatwick Airport shuttle car, December 2024

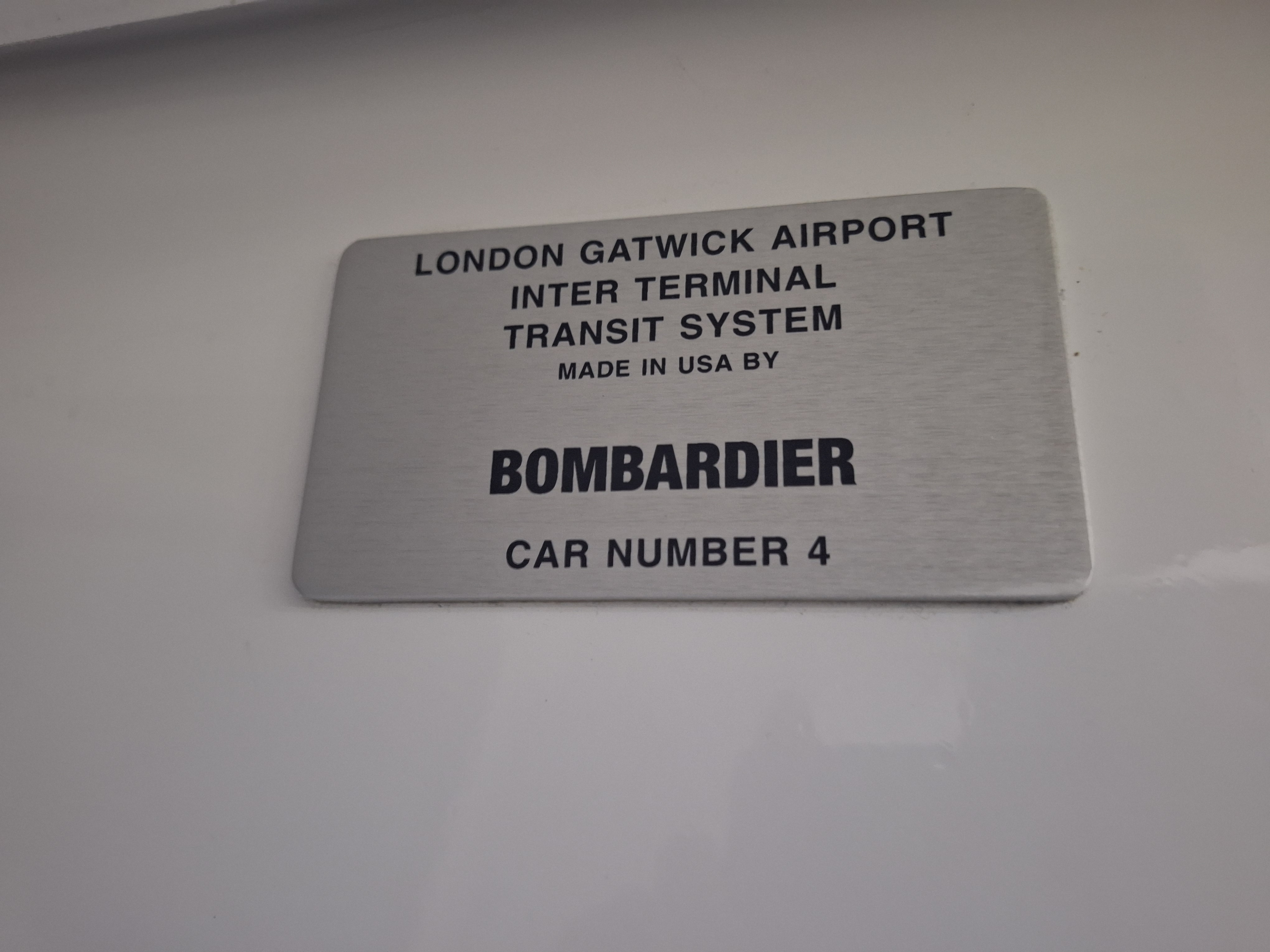
Bombardier's nameplate inside a Gatwick Airport shuttle car
