= List of airport people mover systems =

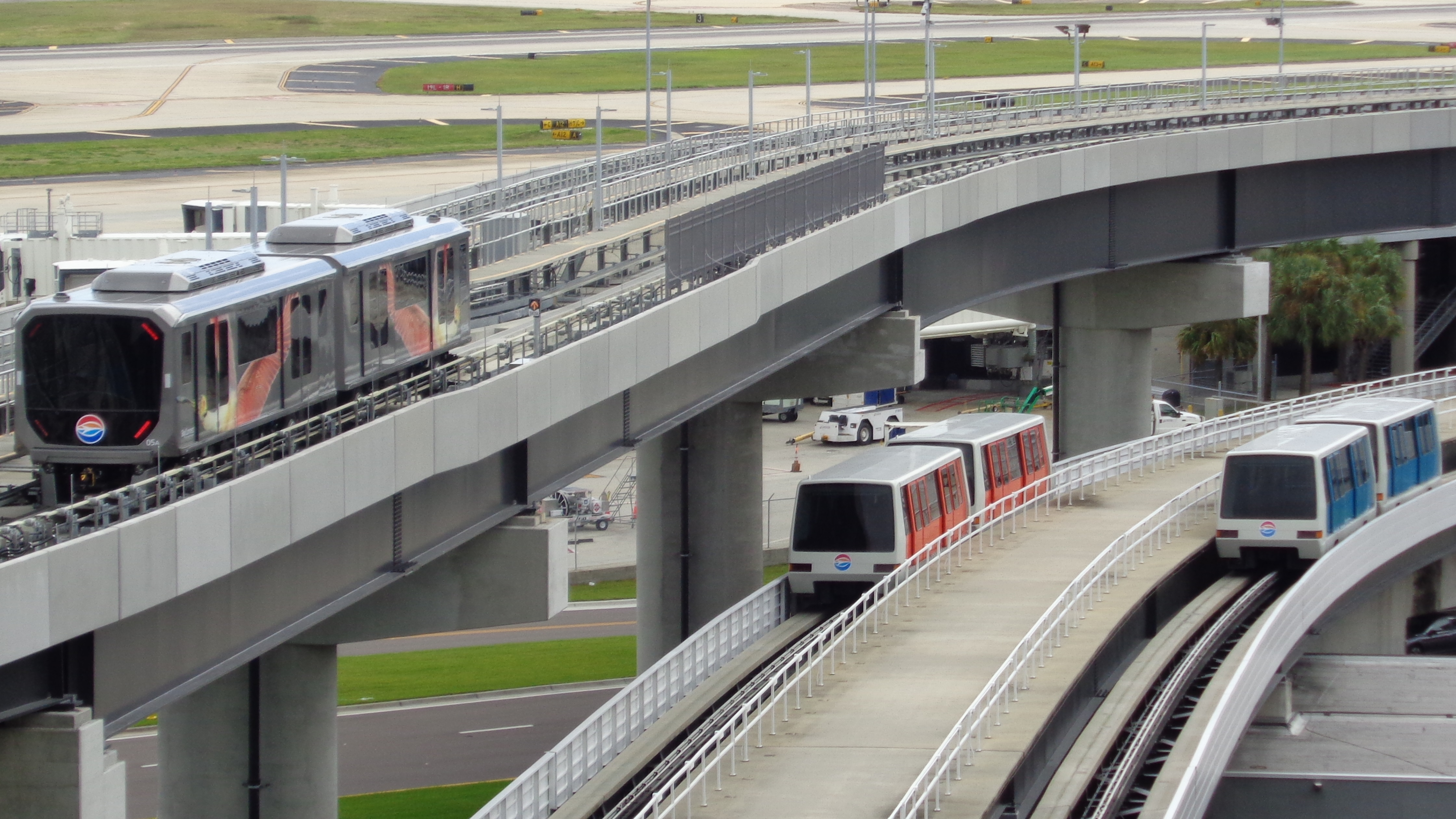
Tampa International Airport People Movers

This is a list of automated people mover systems located at airports around the world. These systems are used to transport people from one location within an airport to another.

Many different types of people movers are used at airports, including automated guideway transit, monorail, and maglev. Airport people movers typically lack seating and compartment spaces, while also having wide doors for quick alighting and boarding of passengers and their hand luggage.

== Africa ==
Country/region	City	Airport	Transit system	Location
Egypt	Cairo	Cairo International Airport	MiniMetro	landside

== Americas ==
Country/region	City	Airport	Transit system	Location
Brazil	Porto Alegre	Salgado Filho International Airport	Metro-Airport Connection (link to Trensurb)	landside
Brazil	São Paulo	São Paulo/Guarulhos International Airport	GRU Airport People Mover	landside
Canada	Toronto, Ontario	Toronto Pearson International Airport	Terminal Link	landside
Mexico	Mexico City	Mexico City International Airport	Aerotrén	airside
United States	Atlanta, Georgia	Hartsfield–Jackson Atlanta International Airport	ATL SkyTrain	landside
United States	Atlanta, Georgia	Hartsfield–Jackson Atlanta International Airport	The Plane Train	airside
United States	Cincinnati, Ohio	Cincinnati/Northern Kentucky International Airport	Cincinnati Airport People Mover	airside
United States	Chicago, Illinois	O'Hare International Airport	Airport Transit System	landside
United States	Dallas/Fort Worth, Texas	Dallas Fort Worth International Airport	Skylink	airside
United States	Denver, Colorado	Denver International Airport	Automated Guideway Transit System	airside
United States	Detroit, Michigan	Detroit Metropolitan Wayne County Airport	ExpressTram	airside
United States	Houston, Texas	George Bush Intercontinental Airport	Skyway	airside
United States	Houston, Texas	George Bush Intercontinental Airport	Subway	landside
United States	Las Vegas, Nevada	Harry Reid International Airport	Harry Reid International Airport Automated People Movers	airside
United States	Los Angeles	Los Angeles International Airport	SkyLink (under construction)	landside
United States	Maui, Hawaii	Kahului Airport	Kahului Airport Tram	landside
United States	Miami, Florida	Miami International Airport	MIA e Train	airside
United States	Miami, Florida	Miami International Airport	MIA Mover	landside
United States	Miami, Florida	Miami International Airport	Skytrain	airside
United States	Minneapolis, Minnesota	Minneapolis–Saint Paul International Airport	Minneapolis–St. Paul Airport Trams	airside and landside
United States	New York City, New York	John F. Kennedy International Airport	AirTrain JFK	landside
United States	Newark, New Jersey	Newark Liberty International Airport	AirTrain Newark	landside
United States	Oakland, California	Oakland International Airport	Oakland Airport Connector	landside
United States	Orlando, Florida	Orlando International Airport	Orlando International Airport People Movers	airside and landside
United States	Phoenix, Arizona	Phoenix Sky Harbor International Airport	PHX Sky Train	landside
United States	Sacramento, California	Sacramento International Airport	SMF Automated People Mover	airside
United States	San Francisco, California	San Francisco International Airport	AirTrain	landside
United States	SeaTac, Washington	Seattle–Tacoma International Airport	SEA Underground	airside
United States	Tampa, Florida	Tampa International Airport	Tampa International Airport People Movers	airside and landside
United States	Washington, D.C.	Washington Dulles International Airport	AeroTrain	airside

== Asia ==
Country/region	City	Airport	Transit system	Location
China	Beijing	Beijing Capital International Airport	Terminal 3 People Mover	airside
China	Chengdu	Chengdu Tianfu International Airport	Chengdu Tianfu International Airport Automated People Mover	airside
China	Chongqing	Chongqing Jiangbei International Airport	Chongqing Jiangbei International Airport Monorail APM Line	airside
China	Kunming	Kunming Changshui International Airport	Kunming Changshui International Airport Automated People Mover	airside
China	Shanghai	Shanghai Pudong International Airport	Shanghai Pudong Airport APM (Note: heavy rail metro connecting the main airport to the satellite terminals; not to be confused with the airport access provided by Shanghai Metro Line 2)	airside
China	Shenzhen	Shenzhen Bao'an International Airport	Shenzhen Bao'an International Airport Automated People Mover	airside
Hong Kong	Hong Kong	Hong Kong International Airport	Hong Kong International Airport Automated People Mover	airside
Indonesia	Jakarta	Soekarno–Hatta International Airport	Soekarno–Hatta Airport Skytrain	landside
Japan	Osaka	Kansai International Airport	Wing Shuttle	airside
Malaysia	Kuala Lumpur	Kuala Lumpur International Airport	KLIA Aerotrain	airside
Qatar	Doha	Hamad International Airport	Hamad International Airport People Mover	airside
Saudi Arabia	Jeddah	King Abdul Aziz International Airport	T1People mover	
Singapore	Singapore	Singapore Changi Airport	Changi Airport Skytrain	airside and landside
South Korea	Seoul	Incheon International Airport	Incheon Airport Maglev	landside
South Korea	Seoul	Incheon International Airport	Incheon Airport Shuttle train	airside
Taiwan	Taipei	Taoyuan International Airport	Taoyuan International Airport Skytrain	airside and landside
Thailand	Bangkok	Suvarnabhumi Airport	Suvarnabhumi Airport Automated People Mover	airside
United Arab Emirates	Dubai	Dubai International Airport	Dubai International Airport Automated People Mover	airside

== Europe ==
Country/region	City	Airport	Transit system	Location
France	Paris	Charles de Gaulle Airport	CDGVAL	airside and landside
France	Paris	Orly Airport	Orlyval	landside
Germany	Düsseldorf	Düsseldorf Airport	Düsseldorf SkyTrain	landside
Germany	Frankfurt	Frankfurt Airport	SkyLine	airside and landside
Germany	Munich	Munich Airport	Personentransportsystem	airside
Italy	Bologna	Bologna Guglielmo Marconi Airport	Marconi Express	landside
Italy	Pisa	Pisa Galileo Galilei Airport	Pisa Mover	landside
Italy	Rome	Rome Leonardo da Vinci Fiumicino Airport	SkyBridge	airside
Russia	Moscow	Sheremetyevo International Airport	Interterminal underground passage	airside
Spain	Madrid	Adolfo Suárez Madrid–Barajas Airport	Madrid Barajas Airport People Mover	airside
Switzerland	Zürich	Zurich Airport	Skymetro	airside
United Kingdom	Birmingham	Birmingham Airport	Air-Rail Link	landside
United Kingdom	London	Gatwick Airport	Shuttle Transit	landside
United Kingdom	London	Heathrow Airport	Terminal 5 Transit	airside
United Kingdom	London	Luton Airport	Luton DART	landside
United Kingdom	London	Stansted Airport	Transit System (scheduled to close in Spring 2027)	airside

== Proposed ==
Country/region	City	Airport	Transit system
Colombia	Bogotá	El Dorado International Airport	El Dorado International Airport People Mover
United States	Boston, Massachusetts	Logan International Airport	Automated People Mover at Logan Airport
United States	Fort Lauderdale, Florida	Fort Lauderdale–Hollywood International Airport	Fort Lauderdale Airport People Mover
United States	Philadelphia, Pennsylvania	Philadelphia International Airport	Philadelphia International Airport People Mover
United States	San Diego, California	San Diego International Airport	Airport Transit Connection

== Defunct ==
Country/region	City	Airport	Transit system
Japan	Tokyo	Narita International Airport	Narita Airport Terminal 2 Shuttle System
United States	Dallas/Fort Worth, Texas	Dallas Fort Worth International Airport	Vought Airtrans
United States	Dallas/Fort Worth, Texas	Dallas Love Field	Jetrail
United States	Greater Hartford–Springfield	Bradley International Airport	Bradley People Mover
United States	Pittsburgh, Pennsylvania	Pittsburgh International Airport	Pittsburgh International Airport People Mover
United States	Tampa, Florida	Tampa International Airport	Tampa International Airport People Movers (monorail)

== See also ==
- List of airport rail link systems
- People mover#Examples

== Resources ==
- Guidebook for Planning and Implementing Automated People Mover Systems at Airports - Planning Manual for implementing airport people mover systems
