= Transit Expressway Revenue Line =

Proposed people mover rapid transit system

Skybus
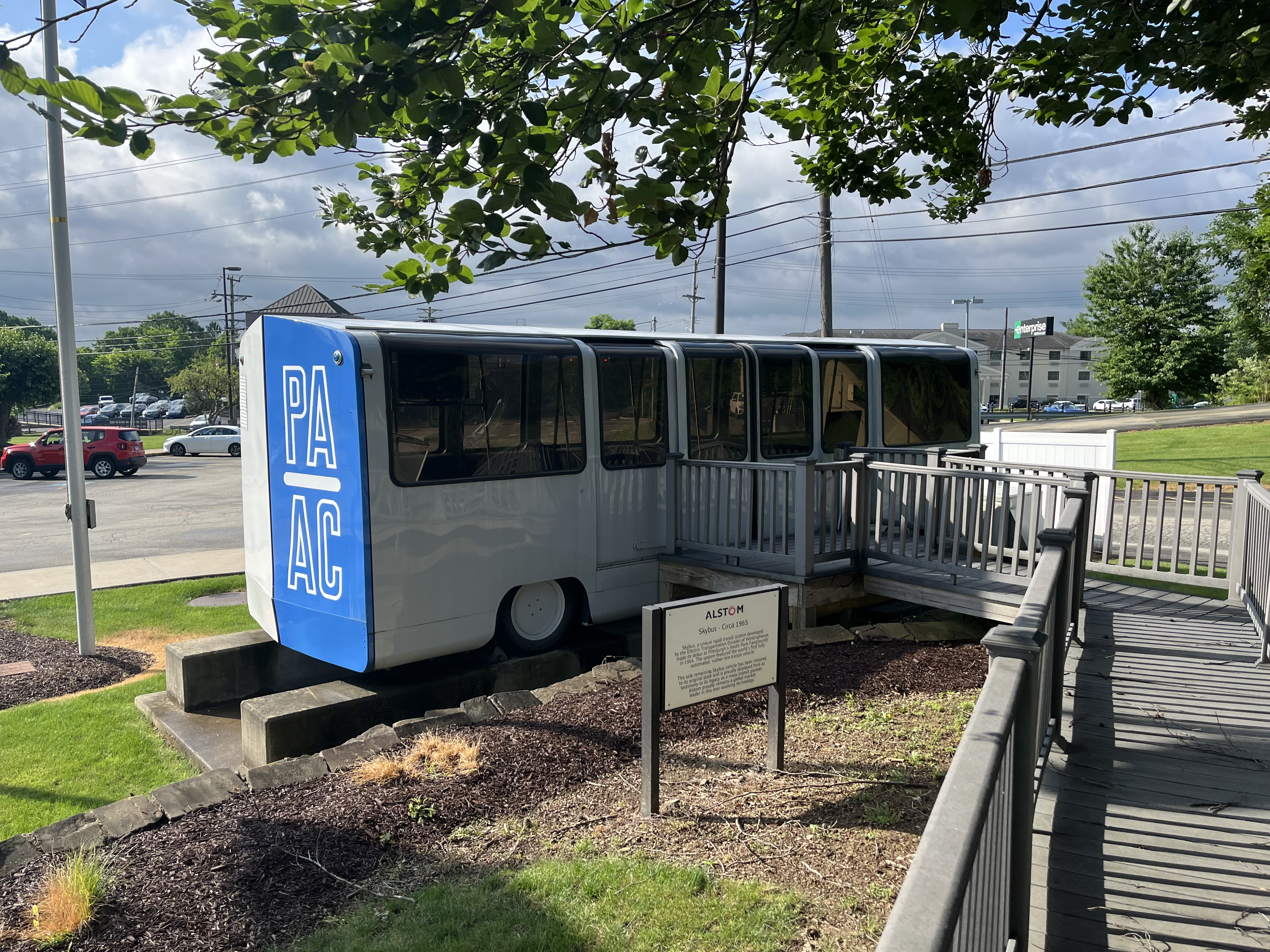
- Prototype Skybus vehicle on display in West Mifflin, Pennsylvania
- Stock type: People mover
- In service: 1965–1971
- Manufacturer: Westinghouse Electric Company
- Number built: 3
- Number preserved: 1
- Operator: Port Authority of Allegheny County (proposed)
- Line served: Allegheny County Fairgrounds demonstration track

Specifications
- Car length: 30 ft 6 in (9.30 m)
- Maximum speed: 50 mph (80 km/h)
- Electric system: Conductor rails, 565 V 60 Hz 3φ AC

The Transit Expressway Revenue Line (TERL), commonly known as Skybus, was a proposed people mover rapid transit system developed by Westinghouse for the city of Pittsburgh, Pennsylvania during the 1960s–1970s. In contrast to the traditional streetcars then in use, the technology used a dedicated elevated concrete track and rubber-tired driverless cars.

A demonstration of the Skybus technology was installed at the Allegheny County Fairgrounds in 1965, and operated as a visitor attraction during the Allegheny County Fair until 1971. Plans for an operational Skybus system in Pittsburgh, including a connection from Downtown Pittsburgh to the South Hills via the Wabash Tunnel, were rejected in the 1970s.

While the Skybus proposal in Pittsburgh failed, the Skybus technology was developed into the Innovia APM, which is in service across the world. A preserved Skybus vehicle is on display at the Innovia APM manufacturing facility in West Mifflin, which is now operated by Alstom.

== Development ==
Westinghouse, a Pittsburgh firm, developed the technology during the early 1960s in cooperation with the Port Authority of Allegheny County, a public entity which by 1964 controlled most mass transit in the Pittsburgh area. With support from the state of Pennsylvania and the federal government, Westinghouse and PAT built a 9,340-foot (2,850 m) demonstration track at the Allegheny County Fairgrounds in South Park. The cars, which could operate separately or be coupled together, were powered by a pair of 60 horsepower (45 kW) motors and could travel at a maximum speed of 50 miles per hour (80 km/h). Each of the four cars was 30 feet 6 inches (9.30 m) long and could seat 28. Power was provided a 565 volt three-phase AC underrail system.

During the 1960s the Port Authority formulated its so-called "Early Action Program", the purpose of which was to establish a more robust rapid transit system in Pittsburgh. The program called for an 11-mile (18 km) Skybus line and two "busways" (bus rapid transit routes), plus rehabilitation of existing equipment. The Skybus route would originate in South Hills Village and follow existing streetcar right-of-way through the Mt. Lebanon and Beechview neighborhoods before reaching Downtown Pittsburgh via the unused Wabash Tunnel. The entire project would cost $295 million; Skybus alone was $232 million.

=== The WABCO alternative ===
In July 1969 an alternative emerged to the Skybus plan. The Westinghouse Air Brake Company (WABCO)—an unrelated company also founded by George Westinghouse, several years prior to Westinghouse Electric's founding—proposed a $114 million plan for a more conventional steel-wheeled light rail system. The 28-mile (45 km) system would originate in the South Hills area as the present streetcar system did and extend through downtown to the East Liberty neighborhood. Driverless operation would be an option, and the system would be fully grade-separated.

== Adopting Skybus ==
WABCO's proposal notwithstanding, PAT voted to adopt the Skybus plan on July 10, 1969. PAT's decision provoked a storm of controversy, both for the decision itself and the manner in which it was taken. Throughout the decision-making process PAT held numerous closed-door meetings and was less than forthcoming about how it chose Skybus over the WABCO proposal. Pro–rail Republican County Commissioner William Hunt stated that "PAT officials should be aware ... that they are a public company using taxpayers' money and these taxpayers have a right to know how the money's being spent." The Pittsburgh Press editorialized that PAT "pulled a monumental blunder the other night when it not only excluded the public from the meeting at which the WABCO proposal was made but actually tried to keep the details of the proposal from reaching the public."

Among the most vehement critics of Skybus was then-City Councilman Peter F. Flaherty (a Democrat), who was a candidate for Mayor of Pittsburgh. Flaherty accused PAT of prejudging in favor of Skybus and rushing the decision to secure federal funding for the project. Flaherty urged additional, open, hearings to better evaluate the merits of the Skybus and WABCO proposals.

In response, the Allegheny County Commission agreed to hold a series of public hearings into the competing plans. Both Flaherty and John K. Tabor, his Republican opponent for mayor, appeared at the hearings to express their views. Flaherty accused the PAT board of directors of having an "emotional commitment ... to the Skybus plan" and of collusion with business-industrial interests in the Pittsburgh area who favored the plan. Tabor split the difference, presenting a plan which included WABCO and a 16-mile (26 km) Skybus loop east of downtown. A continuing source of contention was WABCO's cost estimate, which PAT's consulting engineer said was at least $100 million too low.

The viability of the unproven Skybus technology, in particular the switching system, remained a concern. In September the County Commission voted 2–1 to adopt the plan. The Commission stated that of the $228 million only $20–30 million would be paid by the county, with federal and state funds making up the balance.

== The end of Skybus ==
The Commission's decision did nothing to end the controversy. Flaherty, now mayor, remained opposed and used his powers as mayor to frustrate the project. In 1971 he and the Port Authority came to blows over the Wabash Tunnel, which Skybus would use to reach the downtown area. The Pittsburgh City Council voted to convey land at the mouth of the tunnel to the Port Authority. Flaherty vetoed the decision. The council voted to do so again, overriding Flaherty's veto. Flaherty then refused to sign the necessary papers. The matter reached the Commonwealth Court of Pennsylvania, which ruled against Flaherty in July 1972.

PAT would spend a total of $9.2 million rebuilding the tunnel and then undoing the work after the system was canceled. In November 1971 the City Council had decided to table legislation funding Skybus. Construction stopped after Court of Common Pleas Judge Anne X. Alpern issued an injunction, ruling that PAT had failed to consider alternatives and that Westinghouse had "an illegal conflict of interest." In January 1973 the Supreme Court of Pennsylvania quashed the injunction on both procedural and factual grounds, holding that the suit was not timely and that Westinghouse's role was not improper.

Opposition to the Skybus project continued, with Flaherty and Hunt demanding that the proposal be submitted to a referendum in the 1973 election. The projected cost of the Early Action Program, including Skybus, had risen from $228 million to nearly $400 million. Governor Milton Shapp offered a compromise proposal, costed at $300 million, which placed Skybus on hold and included six commuter rail lines (including the future PATrain). A major issue remained the disposition of two sources of money: state and federal. U.S. Secretary of Transportation John Volpe had announced a $60 million grant in September 1971, and more money would be advanced as the Skybus project developed. Shapp, as governor, controlled a disbursement of $38 million in state money. Flaherty argued that the funds could be used for any transit project and were not tied to the Skybus project itself.

The position of the Urban Mass Transportation Administration (UMTA) became crucial: Skybus could not be built without federal support. The Port Authority, city, and state could not agree on an appropriate plan which would serve both the city of Pittsburgh and surrounding Allegheny County. The Port Authority remained committed to Skybus, as did a majority of the County Commission. Mayor Flaherty continued to favor a mix of traditional heavy and light rail, as did Governor Shapp. Ultimately in 1976 a cross-jurisdiction task force recommended light rail instead of Skybus, and the UMTA support was withdrawn.

Once the Allegheny County Fair was done away with in the early 1970s, rides on the Skybus track ceased. In the Spring and Summer of 1980 the county had the track, cars and computer dismantled and bartered for scrap, with the computer building becoming a park police office.

== Legacy ==
The Skybus tests proved that rubber tire driverless transit could function. Westinghouse Electric would later have a role in the development of the first major fully automated transit system in the country with Miami's Metromover. Westinghouse built the first 12 Adtranz C-100 buses used for the Metromover. Westinghouse would also participate in the development of similar driverless transit systems like the Bay Area Rapid Transit system in California, and automated people movers at several major U.S. airports, including Tampa, Orlando, and Dallas-Ft. Worth.

== See also ==
- Morgantown Personal Rapid Transit
