= Innovia APM =

Automated people mover system

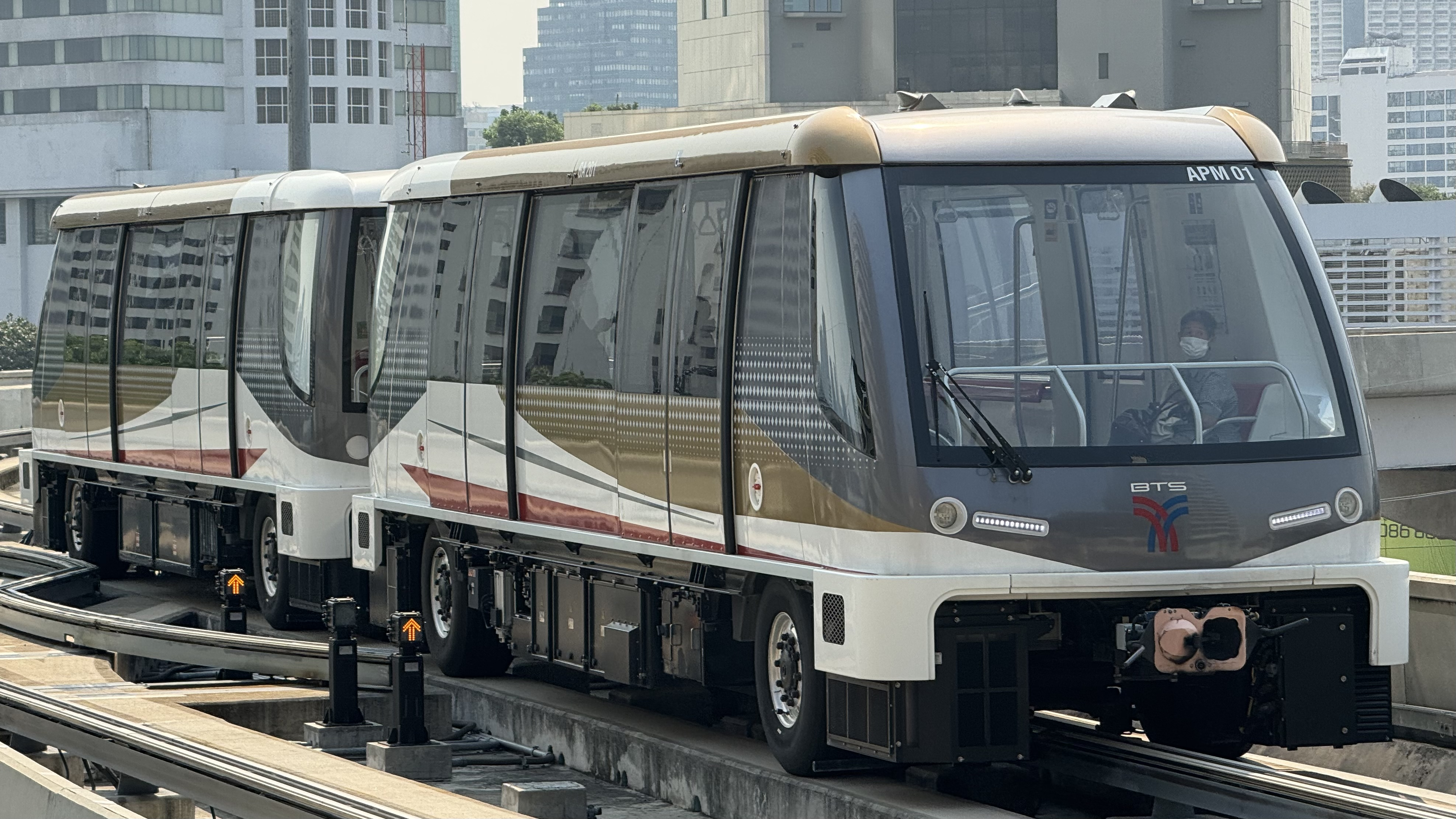
- An Innovia APM 300 on the Gold Line in Bangkok
- Stock type: Automated people mover
- In service: 1963–present
- Manufacturers: Westinghouse (1963–1988); AEG (1988–1996); Adtranz (1996–2001); Bombardier (2001–2021); CRRC Nanjing Puzhen (2014–present); Alstom (2021–present)
- Designer: Westinghouse
- Built at: West Mifflin, Pennsylvania, United States of America (USA) (Alstom); Wuhu, China (CRRC Nanjing Puzhen and Alstom)
- Family name: Innovia

Innovia APM is a rubber-tired automated people mover system (APM) currently manufactured and marketed by Alstom as part of its Innovia series of fully automated transportation systems. The technology was introduced in 1963 by Westinghouse and has been improved over three generations: the Innovia APM 100 (known originally as C-100 and CX-100), Innovia APM 200 (originally known as just Innovia people mover), and the latest model, the Innovia APM 300. The license to use the technology has also changed hands several times, from Westinghouse to AEG in 1988, to Adtranz in 1996, to Bombardier Transportation in 2001, and most recently to Alstom in 2021.

The Innovia APM is mostly implemented in airports, but some rapid transit lines in cities such as Singapore, Bangkok and Miami also implement the Innovia APM.

== History ==
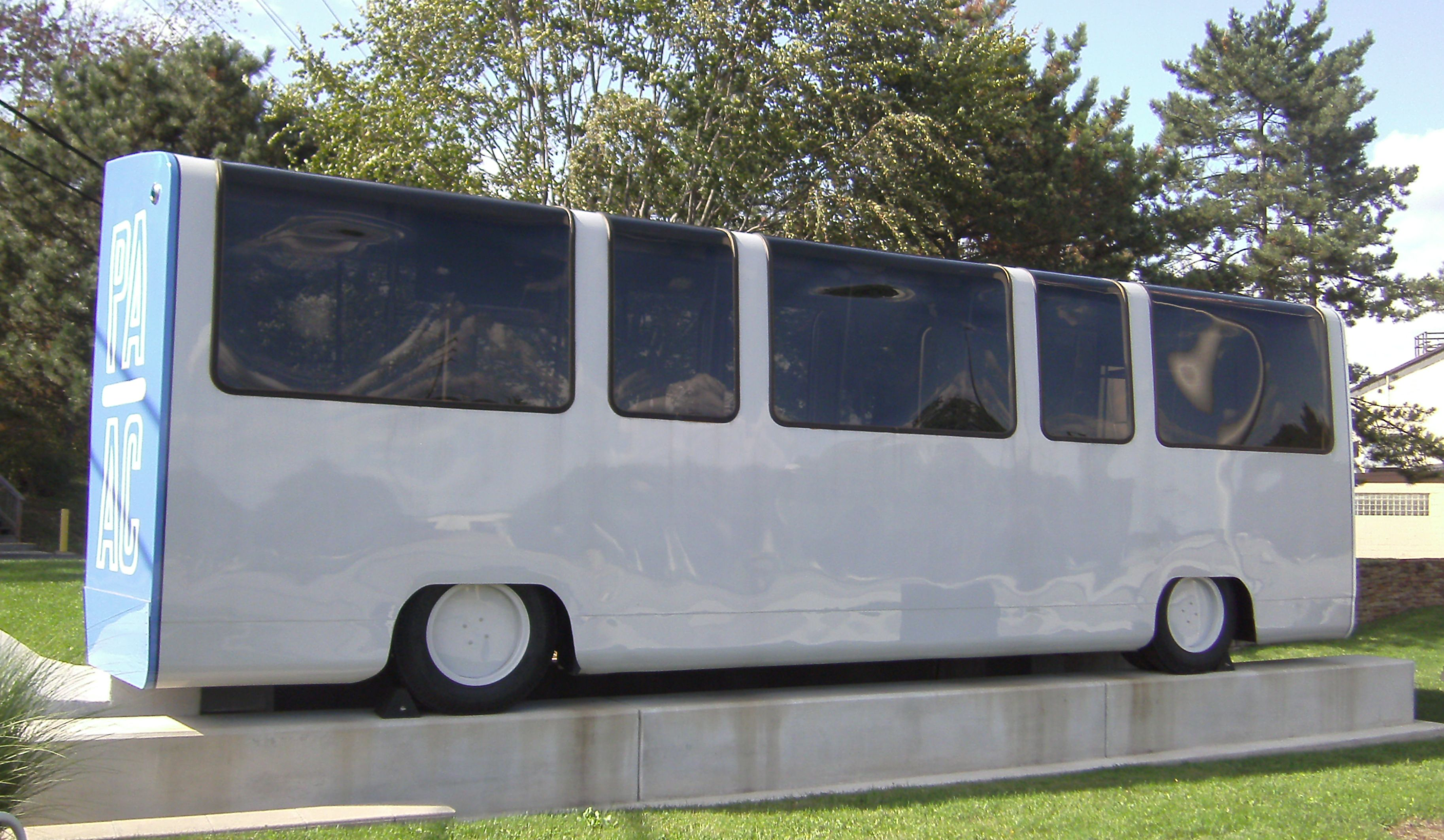
A refurbished Skybus on display at Alstom's factory in West Mifflin, PA

Development began in the 1960s when Westinghouse, a Pittsburgh, Pennsylvania, company, first engineered an automated people mover (APM) for use on a demonstration project at the Allegheny County Fairgrounds in Pittsburgh. The technology came to be known as the Skybus, because it was a rubber-tired vehicle, similar to a bus that operated on a designated elevated roadway. Engineers believed that it would be able to move 5,000 to 14,000 people per hour per direction, and could offer around-the-clock service every two minutes. After the tests, Westinghouse and the Port Authority of Allegheny County attempted to build a larger system, the Transit Expressway Revenue Line, which proved controversial. Political leaders were skeptical of the rubber-tired mass transit technology, and accused the Port Authority of improperly choosing Westinghouse's APM over a competing proposal for a more traditional light rail system. Eventually plans to implement a Skybus system in Pennsylvania were rejected. Despite this, work continued on the technology.

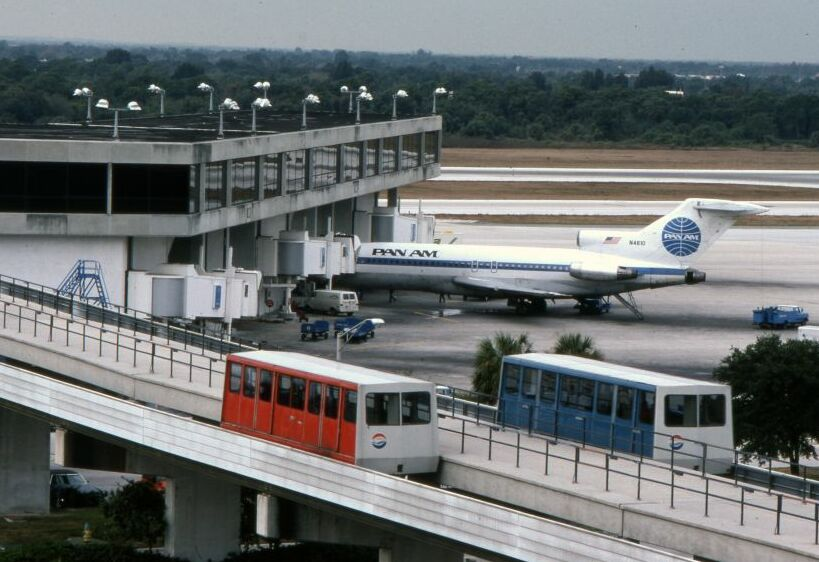
First-generation C-100 vehicles operating at Tampa International Airport in 1982

In 1971, Westinghouse was finally able to commercialize its APM technology, selling what it called the C-100 system to Tampa International Airport, ushering in dozens of similar people mover systems at airports around the world. The C-100 was improved with an updated second-generation of vehicles, and the more heavily updated CX-100 system. All together, 14 systems were delivered in the 1980s and 1990s.

The APM technology was purchased by AEG in 1988 and later transferred to Adtranz in 1996.

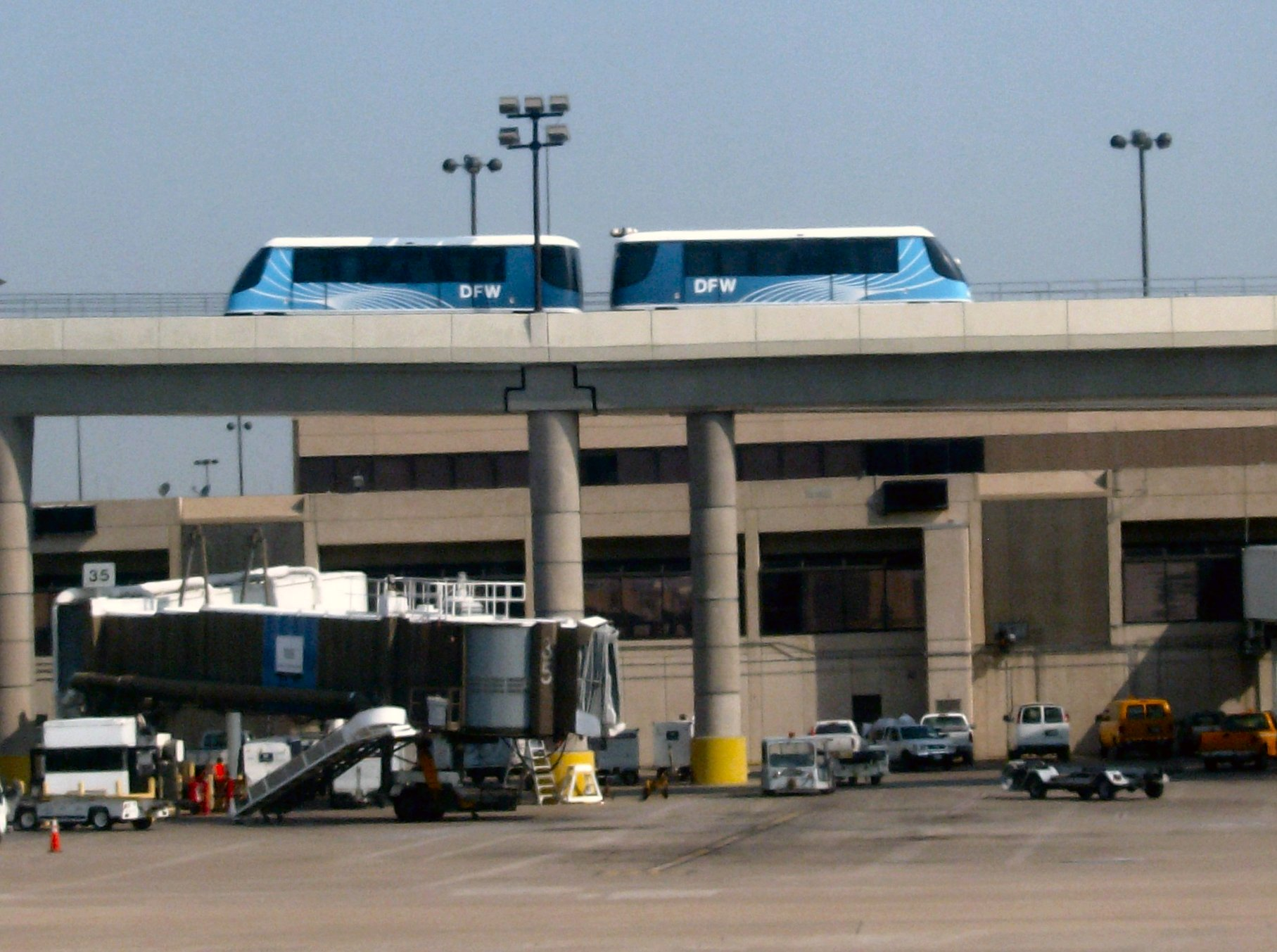
Innovia vehicles (later renamed Innovia 200 APM) operating on DFW Skylink

As the competing Crystal Mover system grew in popularity, Adtranz began developing a new, more aerodynamic model known as Innovia, which started testing in 1999. In addition to its sleeker appearance, the new Innovia people mover also offered greater speeds, tighter turns, full composite construction and a choice in end caps. The first Innovia people mover system opened in 2005 at Dallas/Fort Worth International Airport.

The technology transferred to Bombardier Transportation in 2001, which continued to sell both the newer Innovia APM 200 and the older CX-100 technology under the name Innovia APM 100. The last Innovia APM 100 system delivered was delivered in 2010.

Amid the development of a third generation model, Bombardier decided to rebrand its entire automated transit system portfolio as Innovia. The two previous models became legacy systems and are no longer marketed to new customers, although existing customers can and do still order more vehicles as needed. The third and latest model is called the Innovia APM 300 system. It looks very similar to the original Innovia people mover (now called the Innovia APM 200 system), but is longer, more energy efficient and capable of 6-car train configurations.

In November 2014, Bombardier signed a joint venture agreement with China's CRRC Nanjing Puzhen to manufacture and market Innovia APM and Innovia Monorail systems in the Chinese market.

== Production ==
Innovia APM vehicles are assembled in West Mifflin, Pennsylvania, part of the Greater Pittsburgh Area and not far from where the first demonstration trains ran. The multi-building facility specializes in automated people mover technology and has three test tracks.

Vehicles manufactured by the joint venture with CRRC Nanjing Puzhen are manufactured in Wuhu, Anhui Province in China.

== Implementations ==
=== Innovia APM 100 systems ===
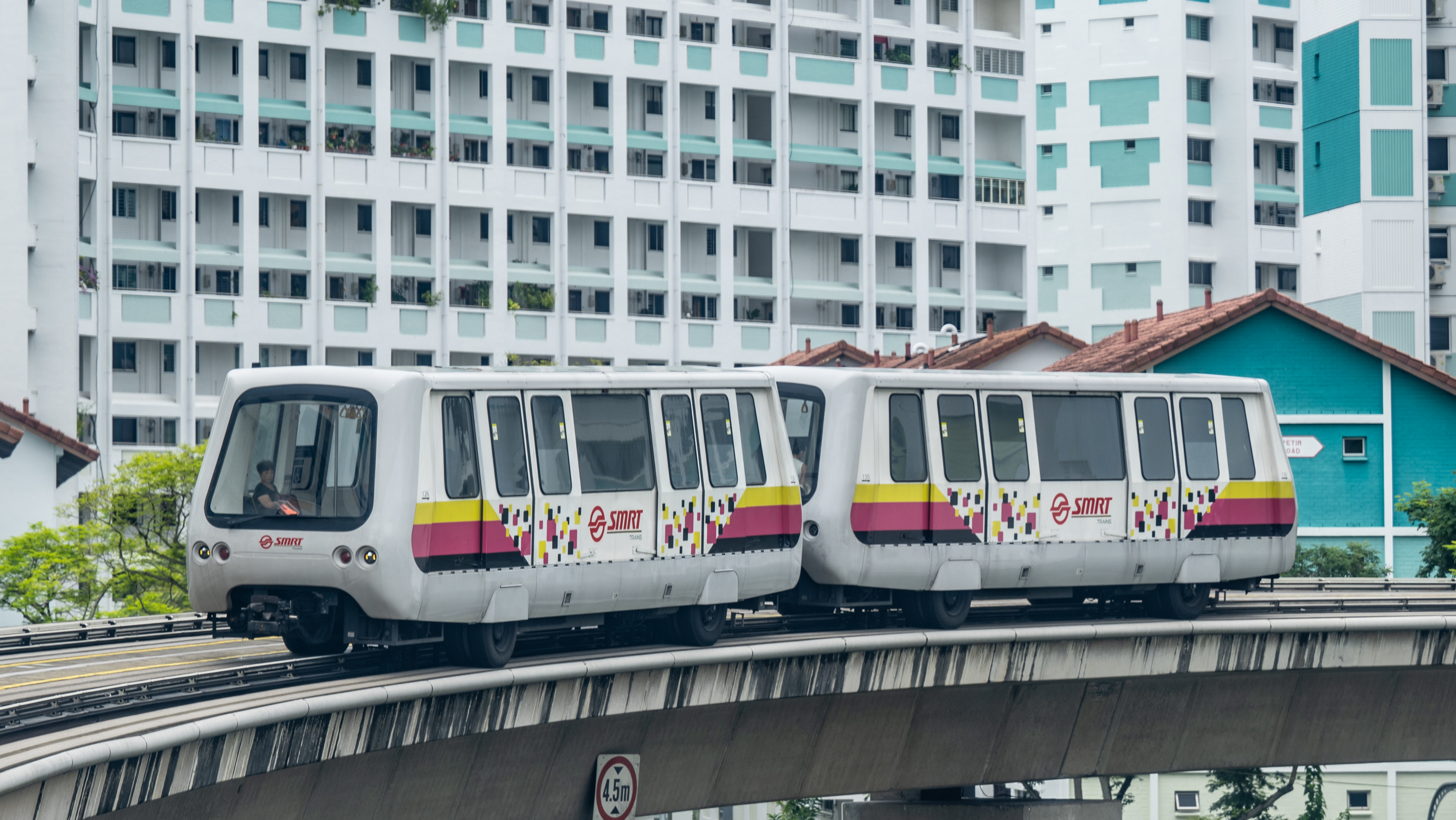
Innovia APM 100 in Singapore

==== At airports ====
- AeroTrain at Kuala Lumpur International Airport, Malaysia (Replaced with Innovia APM 300 rolling stock in 2025)
- AirTrain at San Francisco International Airport, United States
- Automated Guideway Transit System at Denver International Airport, United States
- Beijing Capital International Airport, China
- Changi Airport, Singapore (replaced by Crystal Mover system in 2006)
- Madrid Barajas International Airport, Spain
- Harry Reid International Airport People Movers (three lines) at Harry Reid International Airport, United States
- Orlando International Airport People Movers at Orlando International Airport, United States (gates 70-129 only)
- Pittsburgh International Airport People Movers at Pittsburgh International Airport, United States
- Satellite Transit System at Seattle-Tacoma International Airport, United States
- SkyBridge at Leonardo da Vinci Airport, Italy
- SkyLine at Frankfurt Airport, Germany
- Skyway at George Bush Intercontinental Airport, United States
- SMF Automated People Mover at Sacramento International Airport, United States
- Tampa International Airport People Movers at Tampa International Airport, United States
- TerminaLink at George Bush Intercontinental Airport, United States
- The Plane Train at Hartsfield-Jackson Atlanta International Airport, United States
- Tracked Shuttle System at London Gatwick Airport, United Kingdom
- Transit System at London Stansted Airport, United Kingdom

==== Urban systems ====
- Metromover, Miami, Florida, United States
- Bukit Panjang LRT, Singapore
- Zhujiang New Town Automated People Mover System, Guangzhou, China

=== Innovia APM 200 systems ===
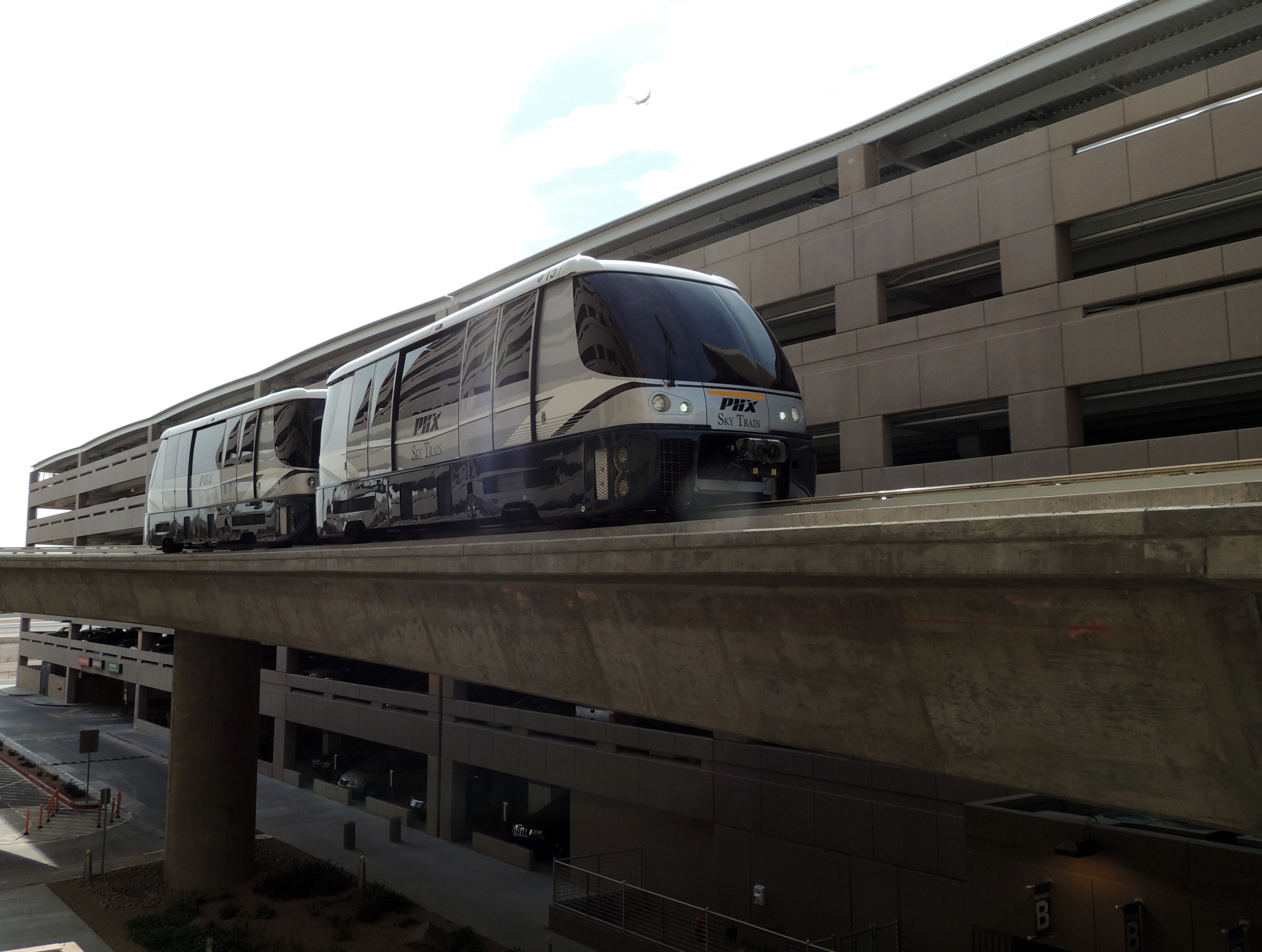
Innovia APM 200 at Phoenix Sky Harbor International Airport

- Skylink at Dallas/Fort Worth International Airport, United States
- Heathrow Terminal 5 Transit at Heathrow Airport, United Kingdom
- PHX Sky Train at Phoenix Sky Harbor International Airport, United States

=== Innovia APM 256 systems ===
The Innovia APM 256 was designed as a direct replacement for the VAL 256 system.

- Wenhu Line of Taipei Metro, Taiwan
- Airport Transit System at Chicago O'Hare International Airport, United States

=== Innovia APM 300 systems ===
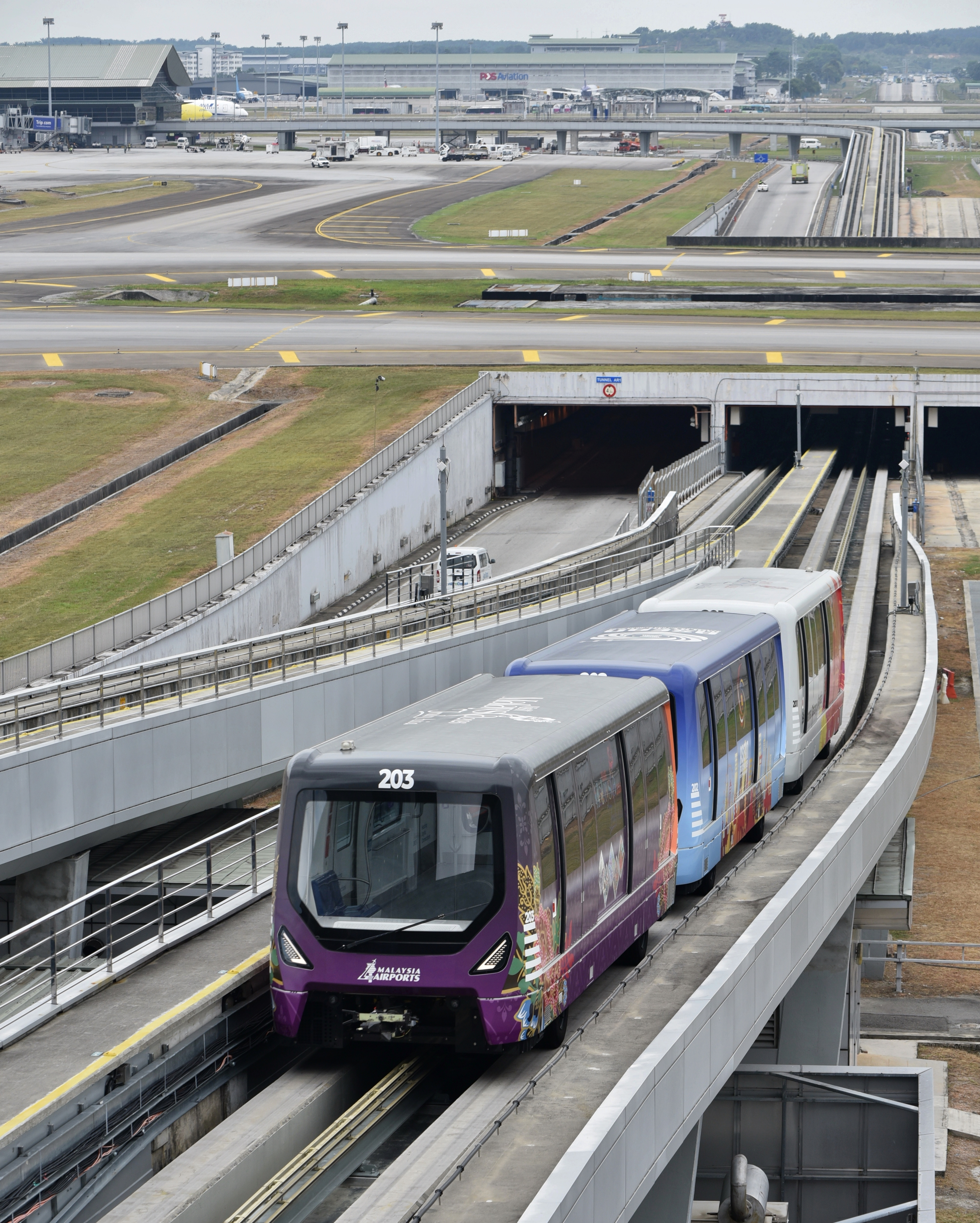
Innovia APM 300 at Kuala Lumpur International Airport

==== At airports ====
- Dubai International Airport Automated People Mover at Dubai International Airport, United Arab Emirates Terminal 1 (Terminal 3 uses Crystal Mover)
- King Abdulaziz International Airport, Saudi Arabia
- Munich Airport, Germany
- SkyLink at Los Angeles International Airport, United States
- Chengdu Tianfu International Airport, China
- Beijing Capital International Airport, China (only new rolling stock)
- Shenzhen Bao'an International Airport, China
- Hong Kong International Airport, Hong Kong
- AeroTrain at Kuala Lumpur International Airport, Malaysia (new rolling stock as Innovia APM 300R)
- Automated Guideway Transit System at Denver International Airport, United States (new rolling stock as Innovia APM 300R)

==== Urban systems ====
- Gold Line, Bangkok, Thailand
- Pujiang line, Shanghai, China
- Bukit Panjang LRT line, Singapore (new rolling stock as Innovia APM 300R)

== Integrated Systems ==
Innovia APM vehicles operate as part of a fully integrated transit system with all elements (vehicles, signaling, communications, power supply and distribution, trackwork, platform screen doors, etc.) designed to function together as a complete package. Typically, these integrated systems are delivered as a turnkey transit system contract.

== Route layout and system configuration ==
Innovia APM systems are most often used in airport settings as inter-terminal connections or links to local amenities in and around the airport such as car rentals, parking garages and local public transit. Currently there are three urban systems used as feeder systems as part of a larger mass transit network. Innovia APM systems operate in tunnels, on elevated guideways, and sometimes in an open cut (pit) or a combination of tunnels and elevated guideways.

They can assume three different system configurations – shuttle, loop, and pinched loop. The shuttle system is the least complex. One train operates on each lane of a dual lane guideway. After the train dwells in one of the end stations for passengers for entry and exit, it reverses direction and returns to the opposite end station. Because Innovia APM vehicles are fully automated, they do not require a driver's cab, which allows them to be bidirectional. A loop is an enclosed system that connects multiple stations along a track or guideway that is a continuous circle or closed curve. Loop systems can be designed as either a single lane or a dual lane configuration. A pinched-loop system shares common characteristics with both the shuttle and the loop systems. Pinched loops look like a dual-lane shuttle (with two parallel guideways), but trains can go from one track to the other changing direction via switches at each end. As a result, traffic on a pinched loop flows in opposite directions on two parallel tracks, but can accommodate many stations.

== See also ==
- Rubber-tyred tram and Rubber-tyred metro

Competing systems:

- Cable Liner
- Crystal Mover
- Véhicule Automatique Léger (VAL)
