= Kahului Airport Tram =

People mover line in Maui, Hawaii

Overview
- Locale: Kahului Airport serving Maui
- Stations: 3

Service
- Type: People mover
- Services: 1
- Operator: Hawaii Department of Transportation
- Rolling stock: two 2-car Schwager Davis, Inc. trams

History
- Opened: May 15, 2019

Technical
- Line length: 2,460 ft (750 m)
- Number of tracks: 1 with a passing loop at Departures station
- Track gauge: guideways

The Kahului Airport Tram is a people mover line that serves the Kahului Airport in Maui, Hawaii, connecting the airport's terminals with the rental car center. It opened in 2019, replacing shuttle buses that previously served the airport.

This people mover is unusual for the fact that most of its route is at-grade, with some pedestrian level crossings.

== History ==
Prior to the opening of the tram, the Kahului Airport used a fleet of gas-powered buses.. On April 15, 2016, the Hawaii Department of Transportation announced the groundbreaking for the airport's Consolidated Rent-A-Car facility, including the tram and a water park.

By September 2018, two of the rubber-tyred trains were delivered, with an opening anticipated for 2019. By April 2019, the system was testing. On May 15, 2019, the Kahului Airport Tram was opened alongside the Rent-A-Car facility. The car rental facility, which cost $340 million, was completed on time and on budget, exclusively using rental car fees.

Service was briefly suspended and replaced with golf carts for four days, beginning on January 31, 2023, for work on the concrete trackbed.

== Equipment ==
The Kahalui Airport Tram uses four rubber-tired trains, numbered 1 through 4, arranged into two-car sets that run on a concrete path, with a guideway in the middle of the track. The trains' external design was inspired by equipment used on historical railroads at Hawaiian plantations.

The trains were built by Schwager Davis, while Innova designed the guideway and an "innovative guideway system incorporating expansion joints". Schwager and Innova also collaborated on designing the switches, buffers, and pedestrian crossings.

== See also ==
- List of airport people mover systems
