= Bradley People Mover =

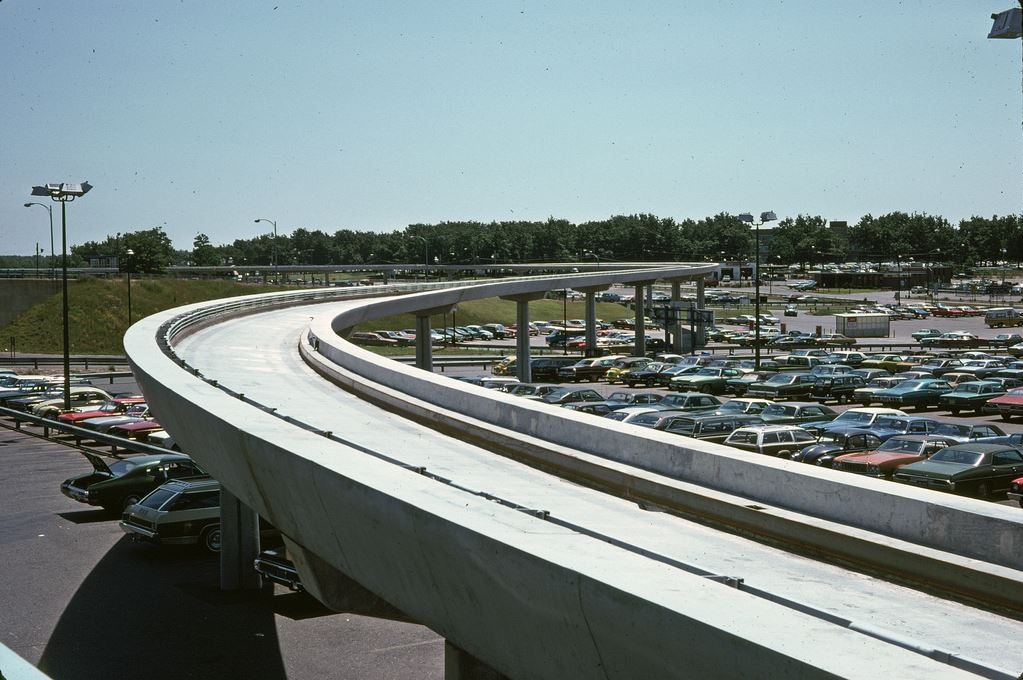
- The Bradley People Mover guideway

Overview
- Status: Never opened; demolished
- Owner: State of Connecticut
- Locale: Bradley International Airport
- Stations: 3

Service
- Type: Automated people mover
- Services: 1

History
- Commenced: 1974
- Completed: 1976

Technical
- Line length: .75 miles (1.21 km)
- Number of tracks: 1–2
- Character: Elevated and at-grade
- Electrification: Ground electrical strip
- Operating speed: 30 mph (48 km/h)

The Bradley People Mover was an unopened automated people mover system located at Bradley International Airport in Windsor Locks, Connecticut, United States.

== System overview ==
The Bradley People Mover system was built in the 1970s to connect Bradley Airport's remote parking field with its main terminal building, located approximately .75 miles (1.21 km) away. The $4.4-million (1974 USD) project was marred in controversy throughout its entire existence, with its purpose and need being heavily questioned on a consistent basis. The people mover system was viewed, meanwhile, by many planners – along with officials from the Ford Motor Company, which won the bid to build the system – as an experiment in airport transportation.

== History ==
The planning of the system by state officials began in 1973. Connecticut Governor Thomas J. Meskill, one of the project's leading advocates, argued that the system would be self-sufficient, and that airport parking fees would be able to pay off its construction bonds. By 1974, the project went before the Connecticut General Assembly, which ultimately refused to appropriate the funds in a bonding package. In response, Meskill tapped into Connecticut Department of Transportation operating funds, using them for the people mover.

On July 18, 1974, construction on the people mover system commenced, with a ceremony occurring to mark the occasion. During the groundbreaking ceremony, Governor Thomas J. Meskill sat at the controls of an auger machine, officially breaking ground on the project. Nearby, a crowd of roughly 20 members of the Connecticut Citizen Action Group (CCAG) – a statewide public advocacy group – simultaneously assembled to protest the system's construction. CCAG and various other public advocacy groups fought against its existence throughout the planning and construction processes, with lawsuits being filed – including federal ones by the NAACP and two environmental groups. CCAG argued that Connecticut's public transportation funds would be better spent on mass transit infrastructure to get commuters to and from work – rather than on the Bradley system, which the group labeled "a trolley for the rich."

In 1975, construction on the $4.5 million system had been completed, and its final tests were successfully executed in December 1975. However, by early 1976, the system was shut down, upon airport officials realizing there was no need for the 1,500‐car outer parking lot to open – all while the 1,700 spaces in the more centrally located lot were not filling up. It was found that the demand anticipated during the system's planning was overly-optimistic, and that a significant number of the airport's passengers preferred utilizing private valet parking facilities next to the airport as opposed to the on-site lots. Critics continued expressing frustration over the project. Many criticized the state for not applying for federal grant monies to relieve state taxpayers of some of the costs, while others – notably the NAACP – expressed concerns that the state mismanaged its transportation funds, and that the limited monies could have gone to other projects to improve mass transportation.

Shortly after assuming the governorship in 1976, Ella T. Grasso decided to demolish the system – by then considered a boondoggle and being colloquially referred to as "Tommy's Trolley," in reference to Meskill – due to its obsoleteness; Grasso's opposition to the system had been a major piece of her gubernatorial campaign.

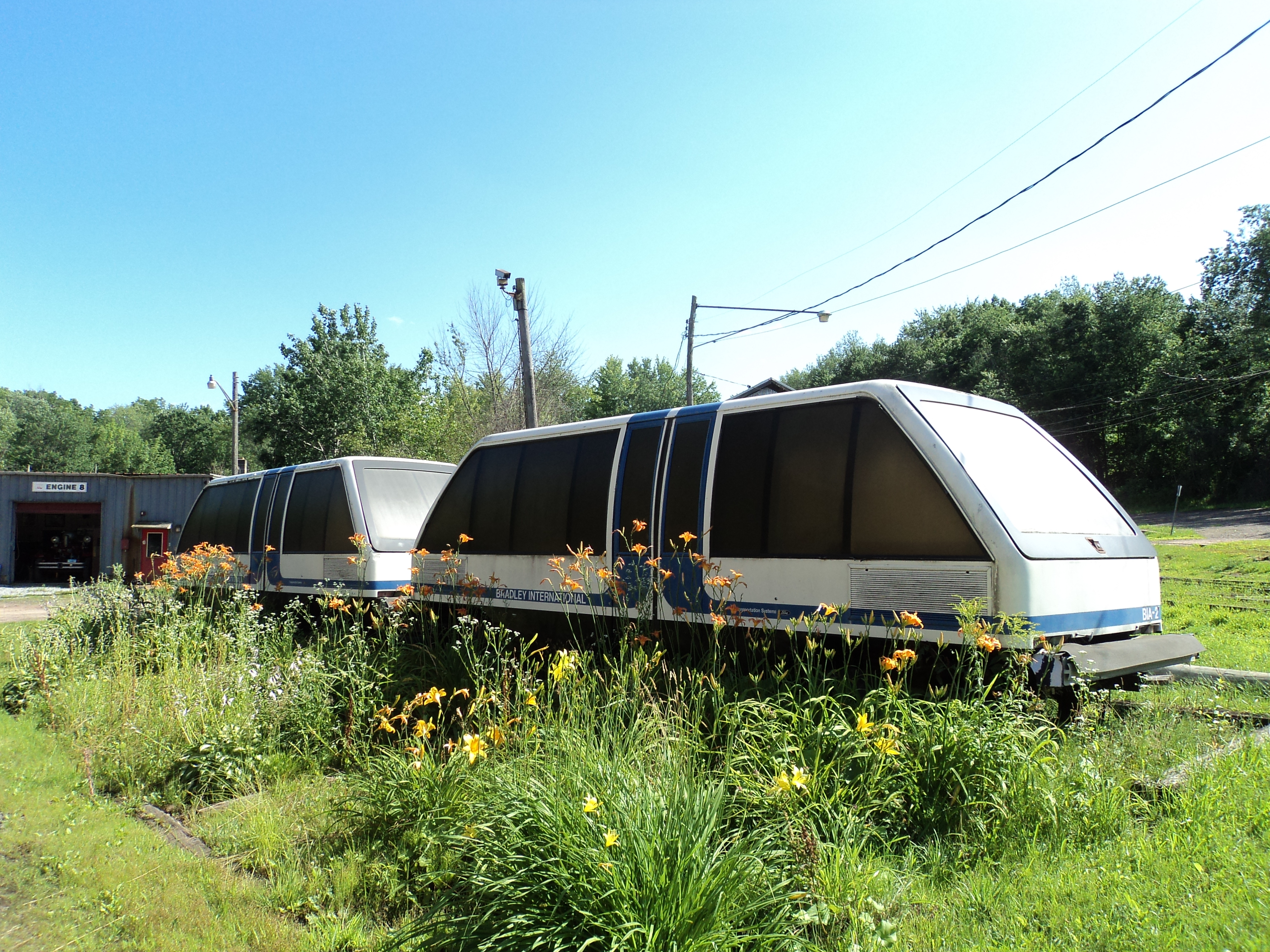
Cars for the ill-fated Bradley People Mover

== Infrastructure and technology ==
The Bradley People Mover system was roughly .75 miles (1.21 km) in length, of which roughly 1,400 feet (430 m) consisted of ground‐level guideway while 2,200 feet (670 m) consisted of elevated guideway. With a top speed of 30 miles per hour (48 km/h), the journey could be completed in approximately 2½ minutes.

The system was similar in many respects to the Disneyland Monorail – spare for the Bradley system operating with rubber-tired trains on a concrete guideway without rails. Electricity was provided to the train cars via a strip along the guideway, which measured roughly 7 feet (2.1 m) in width.

The people mover had three stations.

=== Rolling stock ===
The system had two aluminum, rubber-tired, automated vehicles, measuring 24 feet (7.3 m) in length. Built by the Ford Motor Company, the train cars could carry 24 passengers, six of them seated. The contract for constructing the people mover system and its vehicles was awarded to Ford, in a competition which saw over a dozen bidders.

As of 2024, the system's vehicles are preserved and on permanent display at the Connecticut Trolley Museum.

== See also ==
- List of airport people mover systems
