= Aerotrain (KLIA) =

Airport people mover in Kuala Lumpur, Malaysia

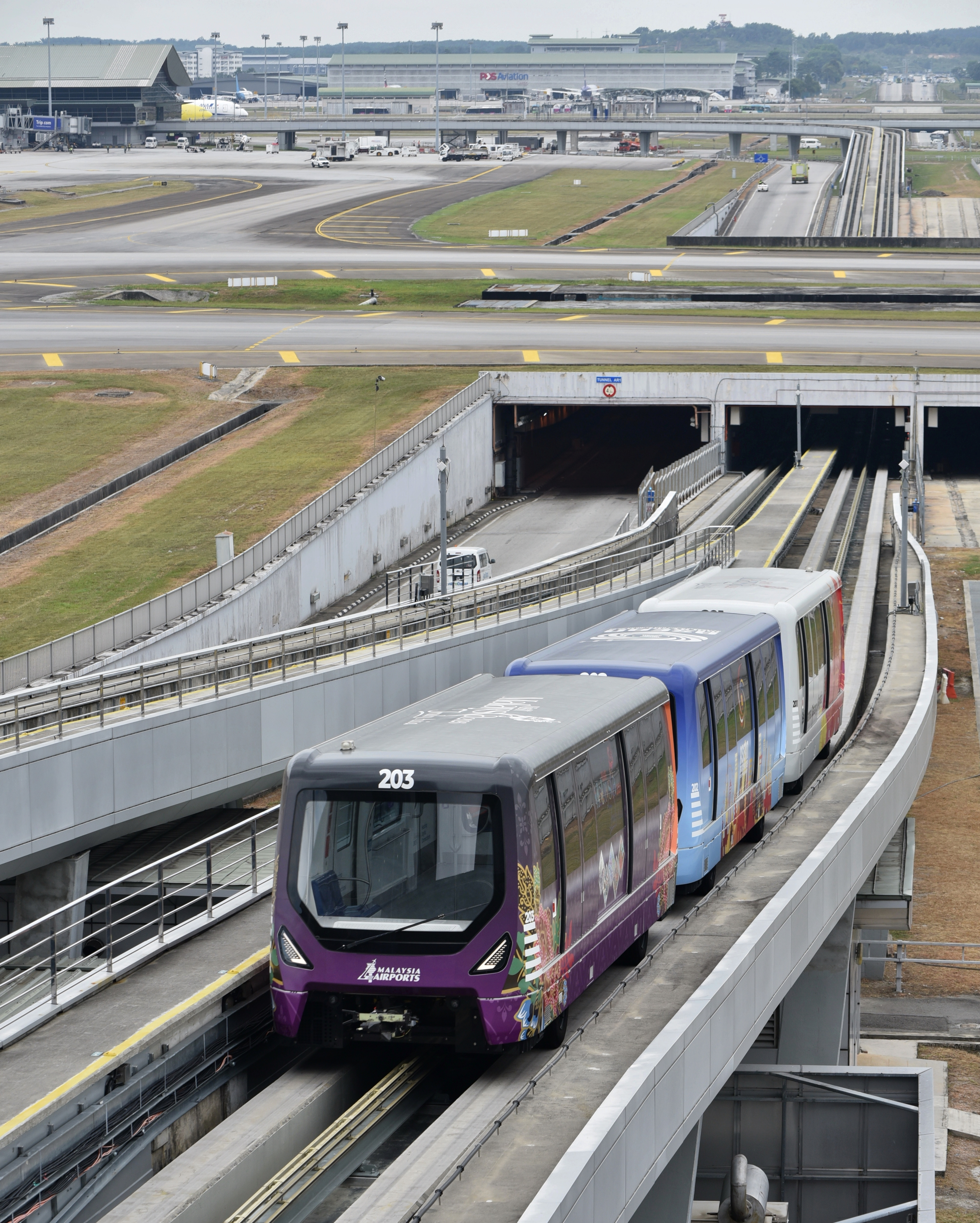
- Innovia APM 300 train 2 in August 2025; in the background, the system's tracks can be seen passing underneath one of the taxiways

Overview
- Status: In service
- Owner: Malaysia Airports Holdings Berhad
- Locale: Kuala Lumpur International Airport, Malaysia
- Stations: 2

Service
- Type: People mover
- Services: 1
- Operator(s): Engineering Transportation, Malaysia Airport (Sepang) Sdn. Bhd.
- Rolling stock: 9 × Alstom Innovia APM 300R

History
- Opened: 1998; 28 years ago (original) then, 1 July 2025; 8 months ago (after replacement)
- Closed: 2023 (under replacement)

Technical
- Track length: 1.2 km (0.75 mi)
- Character: Serves sterile parts of the airport
- Electrification: 600 V 50 Hz 3-phase AC third rail
- Operating speed: Maximum speed 56 km/h (35 mph), Minimum speed 47 km/h (29 mph)

The Aerotrain is an automated people mover system located within Kuala Lumpur International Airport (KLIA) in Malaysia.

The Aerotrain opened in 1998 along with KLIA, the Aerotrain system consists of two stations, one in the Main Terminal Building and the other in Satellite Building A.

Notably, the Aerotrain has been plagued by operational and maintenance issues since the late 2000s, with the most notable breakdown occurred in March 2023, which saw the Aerotrain being suspended for nearly 2 and a half years to make way for replacement works.

During the final phase of testing, Transport Minister Anthony Loke announced that the system would resume operations on 1 July 2025.

The Aerotrain officially resumed operations on 1 July 2025, with the first train entering service at 10 am.

== General information ==
The Aerotrain is fully automated and driverless. Usually, two trains ply between the two stations. In accordance with the Spanish solution, when the train reaches the platform, the exit doors will open first for passengers to disembark, after which the entrance door on the other side will open.

Part of the train track goes underground to cross the taxiway. The ride between the Main Terminal Building and Satellite Terminal A takes about 2.5 minutes.

The Aerotrain supported various operating modes such as Synchronized Double Shuttle Mode, Offset synchronized Double Shuttle Mode, Unsynchronized Double Shuttle Mode, Single Shuttle Mode, On-Call Mode, Test Train Mode and Out Of Service Mode. The Aerotrain has 4 major sub-systems, namely the Central Control System, Vehicle System, Station Automatic Train Operation (ATO) System and Power Distribution System (PDS).

The maintenance of the Aerotrain is scheduled at 10am-12pm and 12am-5am every day, when only one of the trains will be running for operation and the other one will undergo maintenance works and safety checks. The frequency of the train decreases from every 2^{1}/_{2} minutes to every 5 minutes during the maintenance periods.

== Rolling stock ==
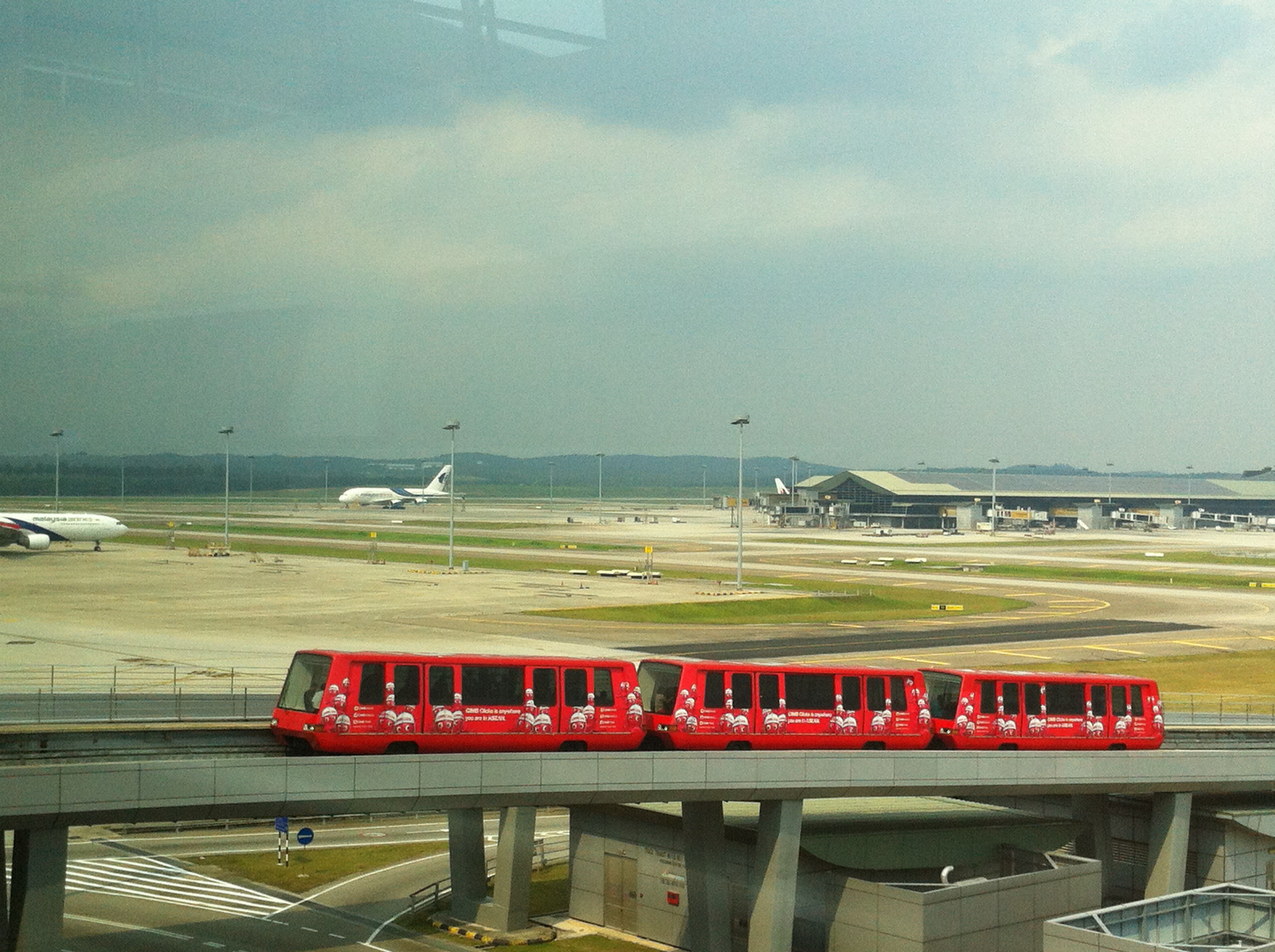
A CX-100 train in June 2015

The original rolling stock was manufactured by Adtranz (merged with Bombardier Transportation in 2001) and comprises 3 CX-100 trains with 3 cars per train (originally 2 cars), of which each car has a capacity of 249. The trains have an operating speed of 56 km/h (35 mph) with a 600 V 3-phase AC power supply at 50 Hz. A 75 kW (101 hp) DC electric motor (model number: 1460-P4, controlled by a thyristor drive) constitutes the propulsion system of the trains.

The system originally operated with only two trains, but on 15 March 2011, a new train known as Train 3 was added to the fleet. This was intended to provide coverage when either Train 1 or Train 2 are taken out of service for an overhaul programme. An overhaul programme was deemed necessary at this point as both Train 1 and Train 2 had been in use for 13 years.

On 28 December 2021, a local engineering firm, Pestech International Bhd, secured a contract of RM742.95 million for the Aerotrain. This contract involved a project to upgrade the 1 km (0.62 mi) automated people mover system at the airport, together with the Aerotrain's operations and maintenance for a 10-year period from 2025 to 2034. The existing CX-100 rolling stock would be replaced with the Innovia APM 300 in this upgrade.

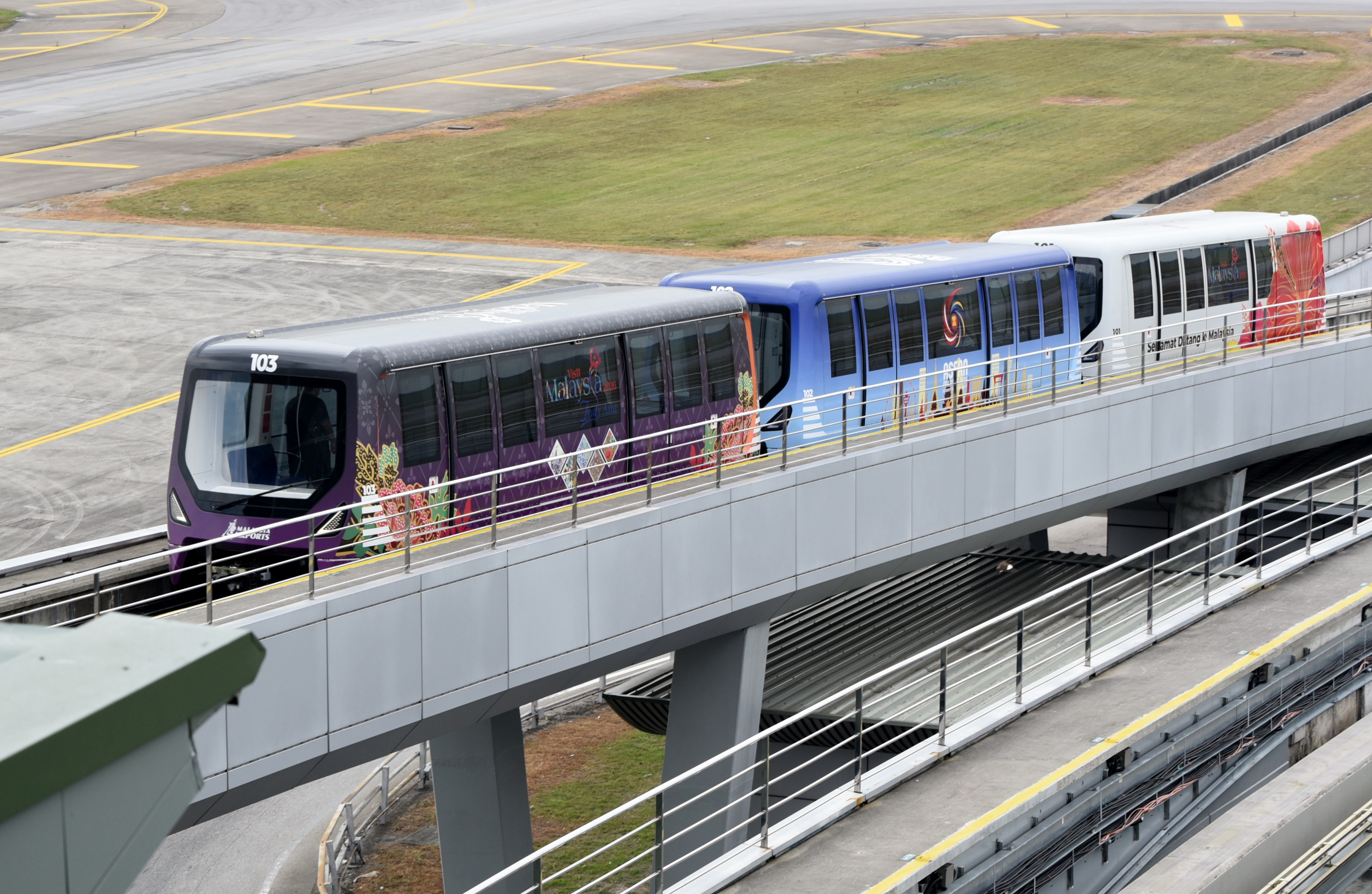
Innovia APM 300 in August 2025

However, delays with the project resulted in the contract to be re-awarded to a new consortium of Alstom, IJM Construction Sdn Bhd and Pestech Technology Sdn Bhd in January 2024. The new rolling stock was delivered in September 2024, and the system was originally planned to reopen by the end of January 2025. However, the new rolling stock remained in the testing stage as of mid-January 2025, with a new resumption date forecasted to be in June 2025. On 21 June 2025, Transport Minister Anthony Loke announced that the Aerotrain would finally resume operations on 1 July 2025.

== Incidents ==
Between 1 November 2010 and 15 March 2011, the Aerotrain service was suspended due to upgrading works. Passengers were transferred between the Main Terminal Building and the Satellite Building by bus shuttles during the upgrading period.

On 25 December 2017, one of the trains broke down in between the two terminals and a detrainment was carried out. This left the aerotrain running on a single train and free shuttle buses were provided.

On 1 March 2023, the service was suspended until further notice following an incident where the Aerotrain service broke down due to mechanical and electronic failures, resulting in 114 passengers being stranded mid-way on the tracks. To take advantage of the suspension, the Aerotrain service would be replaced with new ones in 3 years' time, as the contract for the Aerotrain service had been handed down to a new company.

== Gallery ==
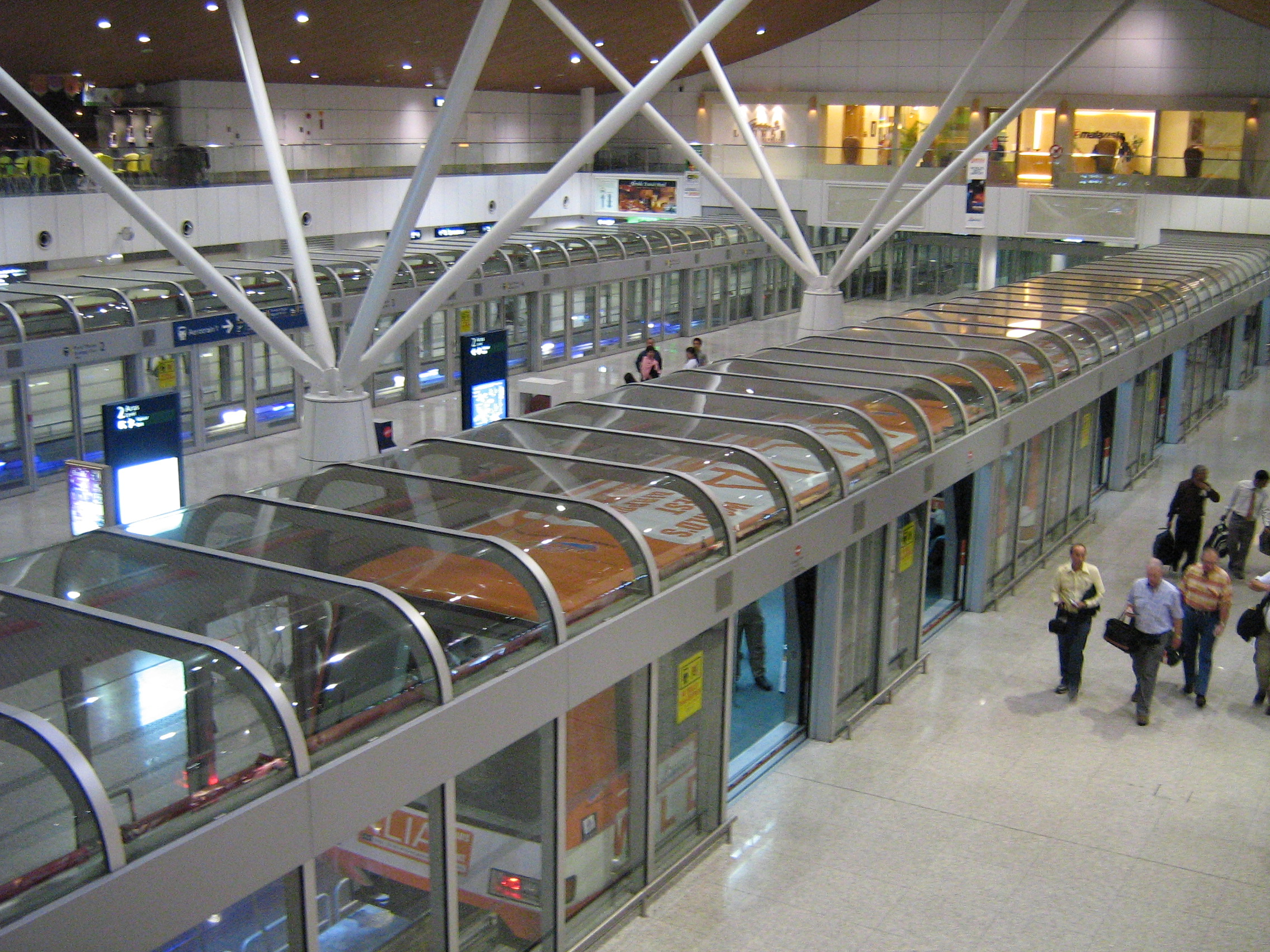
KLIA Aerotrain station at Satellite A Building

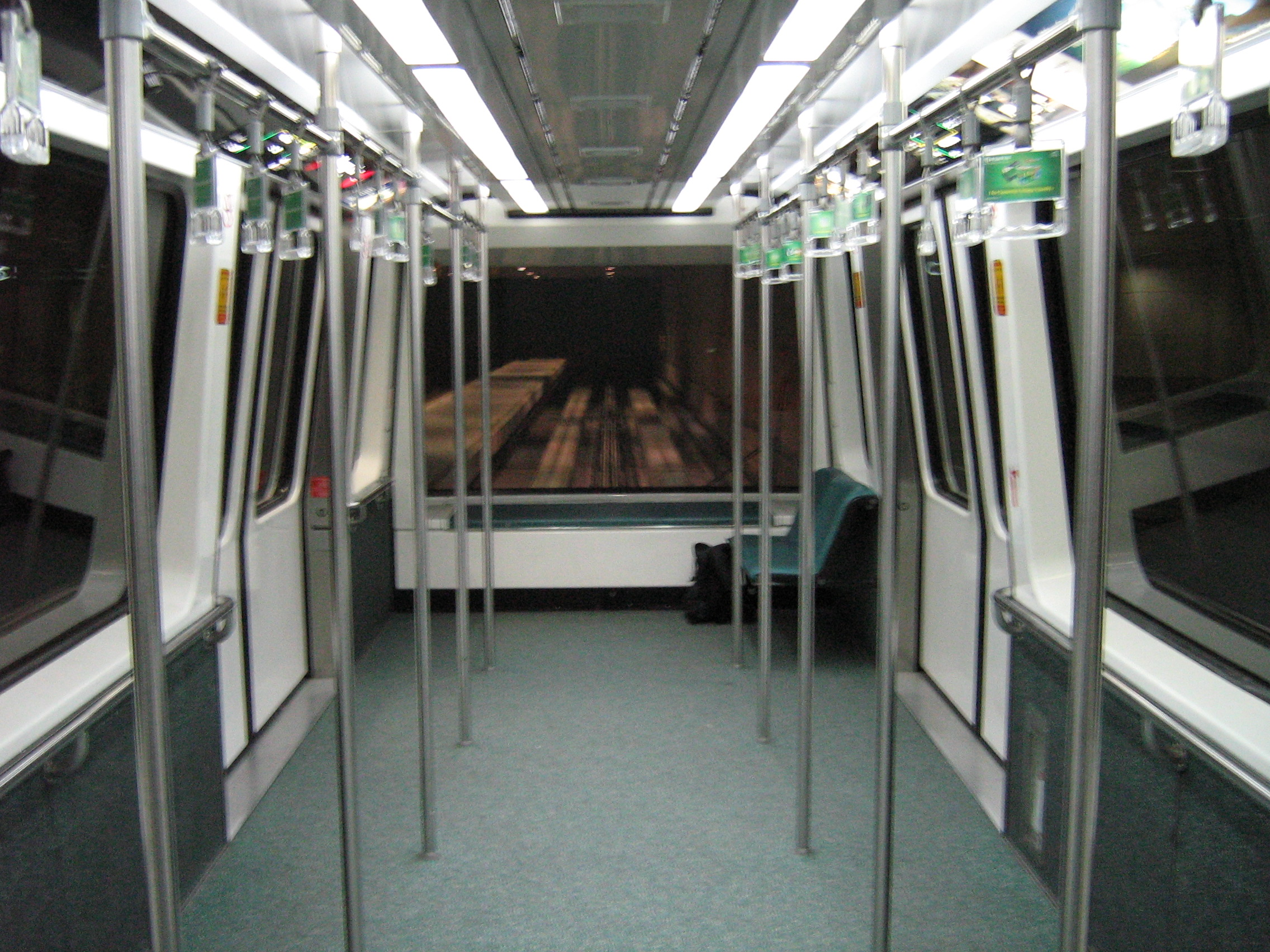
The interior of a KLIA Aerotrain.

Overhaul program underframe

Installation of New Drive Axle assembly

Overhaul program in progress

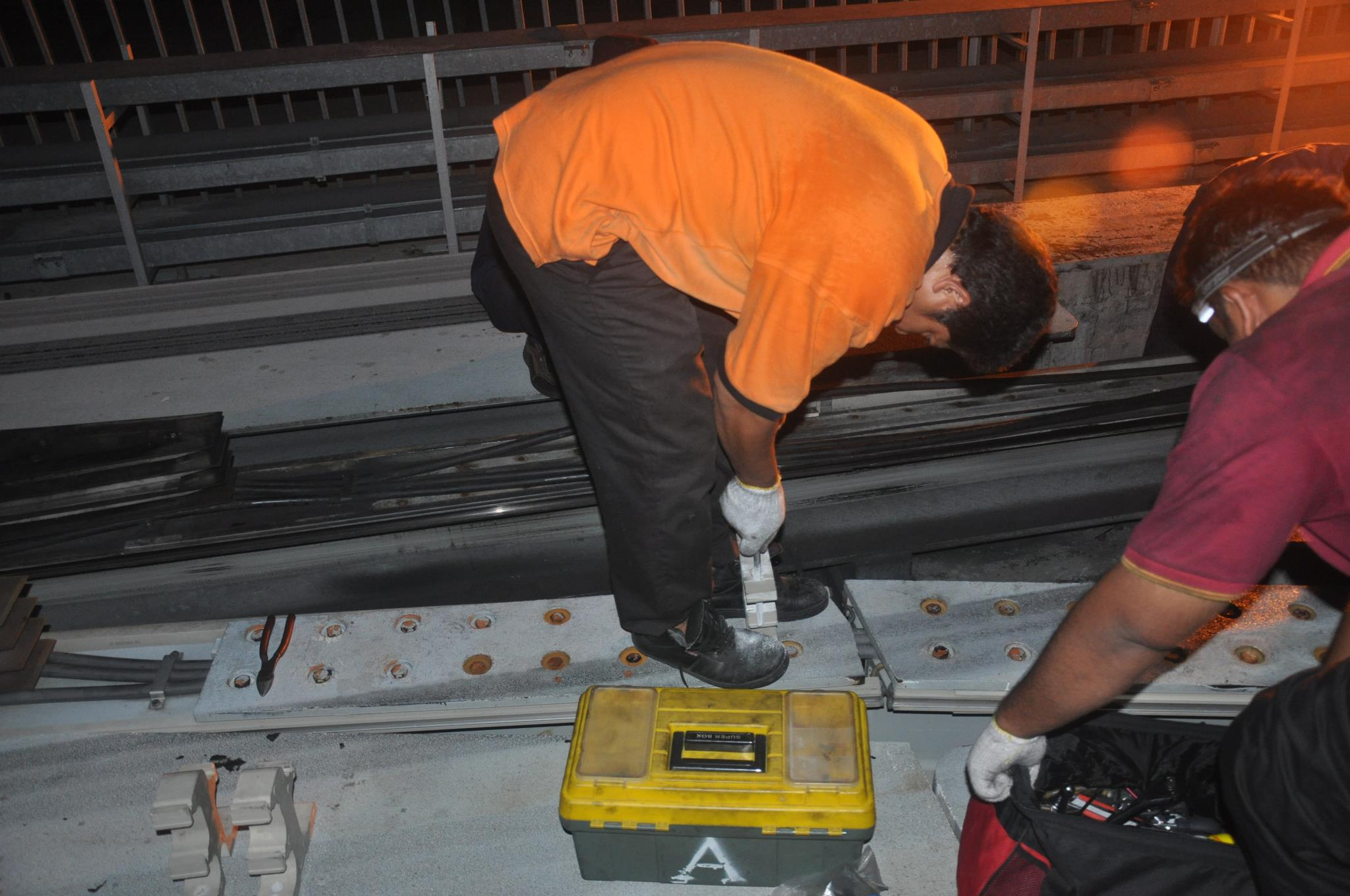
Wayside track maintenance

Lift-up vehicle process at KLIA MAHB Operations, Maintenance and Storage Facility (OMSF)

== See also ==
- List of airport people mover systems
