= Wing Shuttle =

Airport People Mover in Osaka, Japan

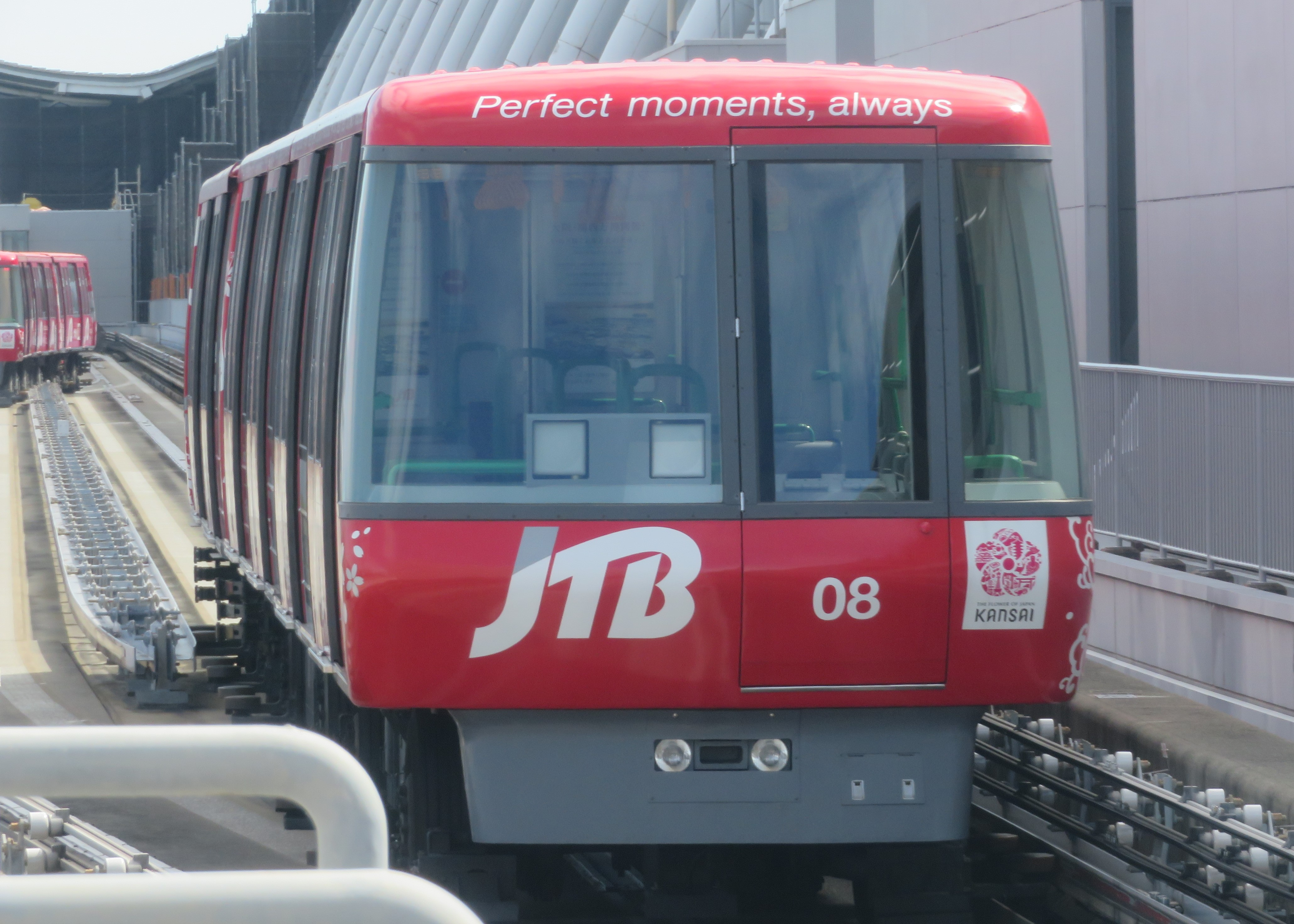

Overview
- Locale: Kansai International Airport, Osaka, Japan
- Transit type: Automated guideway transit
- Number of lines: 2
- Number of stations: 6

Operation
- Began operation: 4 September 1994
- Operators: Kansai International Airport Co., Ltd.

Technical
- Electrification: Conductor rails, 600 V 50 Hz 3φ AC
- Top speed: 35 km/h (22 mph)

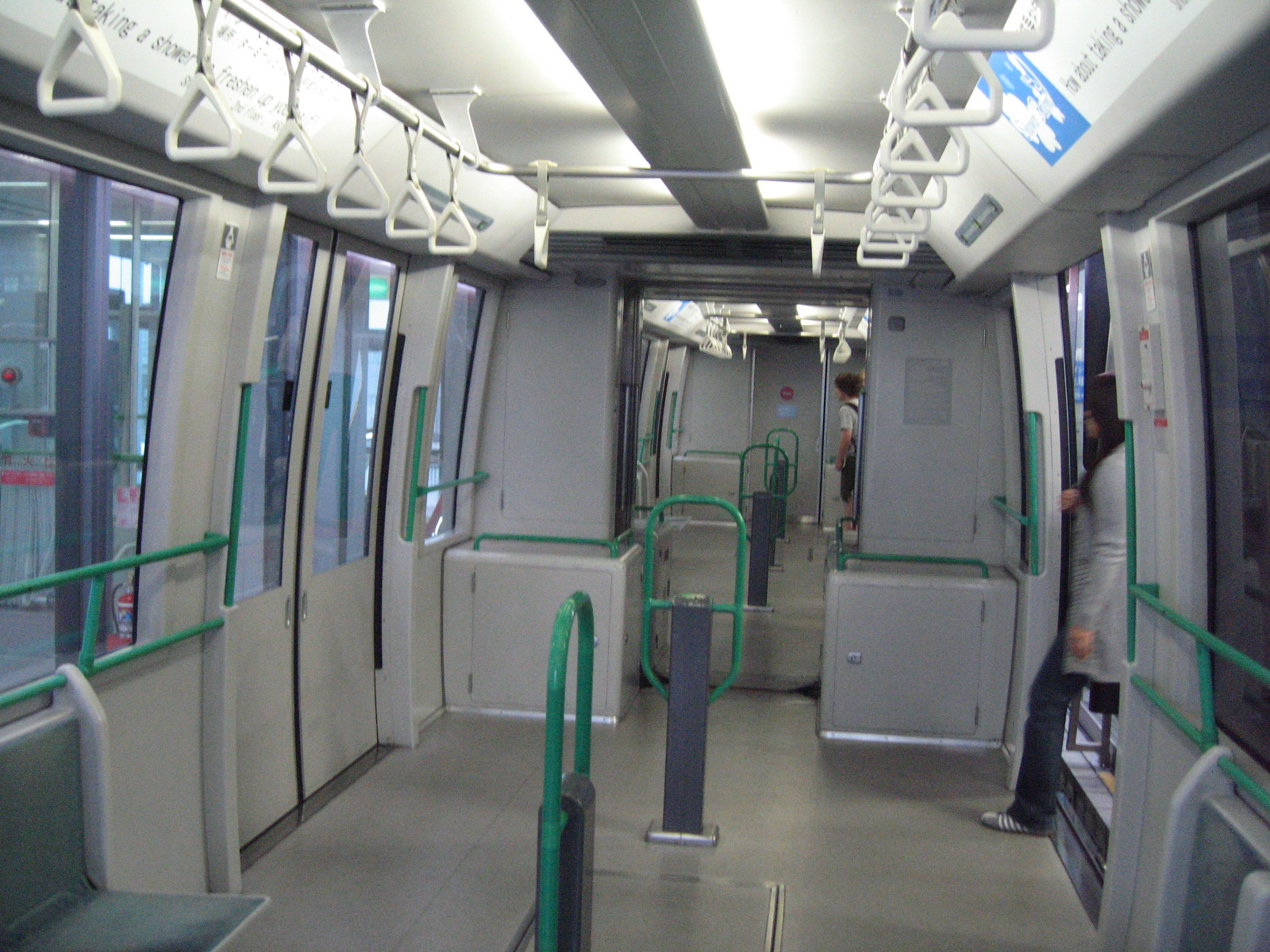
Wing Shuttle interior

The Wing Shuttle (ウイングシャトル, Uingu Shatoru) is a people mover system at Kansai International Airport in Osaka, Japan. The system opened on 4 September 1994, with the opening of the airport itself. The driverless people mover lines link the main terminal building and the tips of two wings. All the stations are equipped with platform screen doors. Trains operate roughly once every 2 minutes and each route is 545 metres (1,788 ft) long.

After the Narita Airport Terminal 2 Shuttle System was decommissioned in 2013, this is the only airport people mover in Japan.

== Lines and stations ==
There are two lines, each running on the North Wing and the South Wing. Both lines have two services; one each terminates at midways, another each terminates at tips. Stations of two lines share same names, although all of them are different stations.

Station name	Japanese	To Midway	To Terminal	Gates
North Wing
Shuttle Station	本館駅	+	+	16, 101–103
Midway Station	中間駅	+	-	1–3, 12–15
Terminal Station	先端駅		+	4–11
South Wing
Shuttle Station	本館駅	+	+	26, 27, 41, 111–113
Midway Station	中間駅	+	-	28, 29, 38–40
Terminal Station	先端駅		+	30–37

Trains stop at stations signed "+", skip at "-".

== See also ==
- List of airport people mover systems
- People mover
