= Dubai International Terminal 3 =

Airport terminal

Dubai International Airport Terminal 3
- Alternative names: Terminal 3

General information
- Type: Airport terminal
- Location: Al Garhoud district, Dubai, Al Garhoud, Dubai, United Arab Emirates
- Coordinates: 25°14′55″N 55°21′41″E
- Current tenants: Emirates
- Construction started: November 2004
- Completed: 2008
- Opened: 14 October 2008
- Inaugurated: 14 October 2008
- Cost: $4.5 billion
- Owner: Dubai Airports Company, Government of Dubai

Height
- Height: Terminal 3 - Concourse A: 40 m (130 ft); Terminal 3 - Concourse B: 49.5 m (162 ft)

Technical details
- Structural system: Steel frame roof with glass facades
- Floor count: Concourse A, 11 floors Concourse B, 10 floors
- Floor area: 1,713,000 m^{2} (18,440,000 sq ft)

Design and construction
- Architecture firm: Aéroports de Paris (ADPi), France
- Main contractor: Al Habtoor Engineering, Dubai, UAE; Murray & Roberts, Bedfordview, South Africa; Takenaka Corporation Dubai Office, UAE

Terminal 3 is an airport terminal at Dubai International Airport, located in Dubai, United Arab Emirates. When completed and opened on 14 October 2008, it was the largest building in the world by floor area and is currently the world's largest airport terminal, with over 1,713,000 m^{2} (18,440,000 sq ft) of space.

The partly underground Terminal 3 was built at a cost of US$4.5 billion, exclusively for Emirates and has an annual capacity of 43 million passengers. It was announced on 6 September 2012 that Terminal 3 would no longer be Emirates exclusive, as Emirates and Qantas had set up an extensive code sharing agreement. Qantas would be the second and only one of two airlines to fly in and out of Terminal 3. This deal also allowed Qantas to use the A380 Dedicated Concourse A. In 2018, Qantas discontinued flights to Dubai, as nonstop QF9/10 from Perth to London were launched and A380 services to London-Heathrow were re-routed via Singapore instead.

The terminal has 5 Airbus A380 gates at Concourse B, and 18 at Concourse A. In December 2018, flydubai commenced flights from Terminal 3 to selected destinations to facilitate transfers to/from Emirates.

As of 6 March 2023, coinciding with the launch of inaugural non-stop services from Newark as well as a partnership with Emirates, United Airlines began operating out of Terminal 3, becoming the third carrier to do so. On 26 July 2023, Air Canada shifted their service from Toronto-Pearson over from Terminal 1 to Terminal 3 as part of their extensive partnership with Emirates, becoming the fourth carrier to operate out of the terminal.

== Design ==
Terminal 3 includes a multi level underground structure, first and business class lounges, restaurants, 180 check-in counters and 2,600 car-parking spaces. The terminal offers more than double the previous retail area of concourse C, by adding about 4,800 m^{2} (52,000 sq ft) and Concourse B's 10,700 m^{2} (115,000 sq ft) of shopping facilities.

When completed, Terminal 3 was the largest building in the world by floor space, with over 1,713,000 m^{2} (18,440,000 sq ft) of space, capable of handling 43 million passengers in a year. That record was overtaken by the New Century Global Center in 2013, but Terminal 3 remains to be the second-largest building in the world by floor space. A large part is located under the taxiway area and is directly connected to Concourse B: the departure and arrival halls in the new structure are 10 m (33 ft) beneath the airport's apron. It has been operational since 14 October 2008, and opened in four phases to avoid collapse of baggage handling and other IT systems.

== Baggage handling system ==
The baggage handling system is the largest system and also the deepest in the world; it has a capacity to handle 8,000 bags per hour. The system includes 21 screening injection points, 49 make-up carousels, 90 kilometres (56 mi) of conveyor belts capable of handling 15,000 items per hour at a speed of 27 kilometres per hour (17 mph), and 4,500 early baggage storage positions. The entire system is located beneath the taxiway area. High-speed conveyors transport the items of baggage in individual trays, which permits better control at high speeds and leads to quicker passenger check-in and 100 percent accurate baggage tracking.

== Buildings ==
Terminal 3 of Dubai International Airport comprises three concourses: Concourse A, Concourse B and Concourse C.

=== Concourse A ===
Concourse A was built at a cost of US$3.2 billion and was opened for operations on 2 January 2013. The total built-up area of Concourse A is 528,000 m^{2} (5,680,000 sq ft). The concourse is 924 m (3,031 ft) long, 91 m (299 ft) wide and 40 m (130 ft) high in the centre from the apron level. It was fully operational within the first month of its inaugural, during which the facility handled 461,972 pieces of baggage carried on over 2,450 flights serving 589,234 passengers. Concourse A is the world's first A380 purpose built facility and also features the world's first multi-level boarding for first and business class passengers directly from the respective lounges.

Concourse A is connected to the two major public levels of Terminal 3 via an automated people mover (APM) in addition to the vehicular and baggage handling system utility tunnels for further transfer. The building, which follows the characteristic shape of Concourse B, accommodates 20 air bridge gates, of which 18 are capable of handling the Airbus A380-800. The concourse has 11 floors, 14 cafés and restaurants, 50 airline counters, and 202 hotel rooms. There are also 6 remote lounges for passengers departing on flights parked at 13 remote stands. The gates in concourse A are labelled A1- A24.

Concourse A has an annual capacity of 19 million passengers; it has increased the airport's total capacity from 60 million passengers to 75 million passengers per year. The facility was built as Emirates exclusive, however it also served Qantas from September 2012 to March 2018, following the Australian carrier's tie-up with Emirates. The concourse includes one 4 star hotel and one 5 star hotel, first and business class lounges, and duty-free areas. The total built-up area is 540,000 m^{2} (5,800,000 sq ft).

=== Concourse B ===
Concourse B is directly connected to Terminal 3, and is dedicated exclusively to Emirates. The total built up area of the concourse itself is 675,000 m^{2} (7,270,000 sq ft). The concourse is 945 m (3,100 ft) long, 90.8 m (298 ft) wide (at midpoint) and 49.5 m (162 ft) high. The terminal has 10 floors (4 basement, ground floor, and 5 above-ground floors). The building currently includes a multi-level structure for departures and arrivals and includes 32 gates, labelled B1- B32. The concourse has 26 air bridge gates and 5 boarding lounges for 14 remote stands that are for the Airbus A340 and Boeing 777 aircraft only. For transit passengers the concourse has 3 transfer areas, and 62 transfer desks.

The concourse also includes the Emirates first and Business class lounges and the Marhaba lounge. The first class lounge has a capacity of 1800 passengers and a total area of 12,600 m^{2} (136,000 sq ft). The Business class lounge has a capacity of 3000 passengers, and a total area of 13,500 m^{2} (145,000 sq ft). The Marhaba lounge, the smallest lounge at the concourse has a capacity of 300 passengers at a time.

The total retail area at the concourse is 120,000 m^{2} (1,300,000 sq ft) completely operated by Dubai Duty Free, and the food court includes 18 restaurants. There are also 3 hotels in the concourse; a 5 star hotel, and a 4 star hotel.

There is a direct connection to Sheikh Rashid Terminal (Concourse C) located at the control tower structure through passenger walkways. There is also a 300-room hotel and health club, including both five and four-star rooms. Concourse B includes five aerobridges that are capable of handling the Airbus A380. Emirates continues to maintain a presence in Concourse C, operating 12 gates at the concourse, as well as the Emirates First Class and Business Class Lounges.

=== Departures and arrivals ===
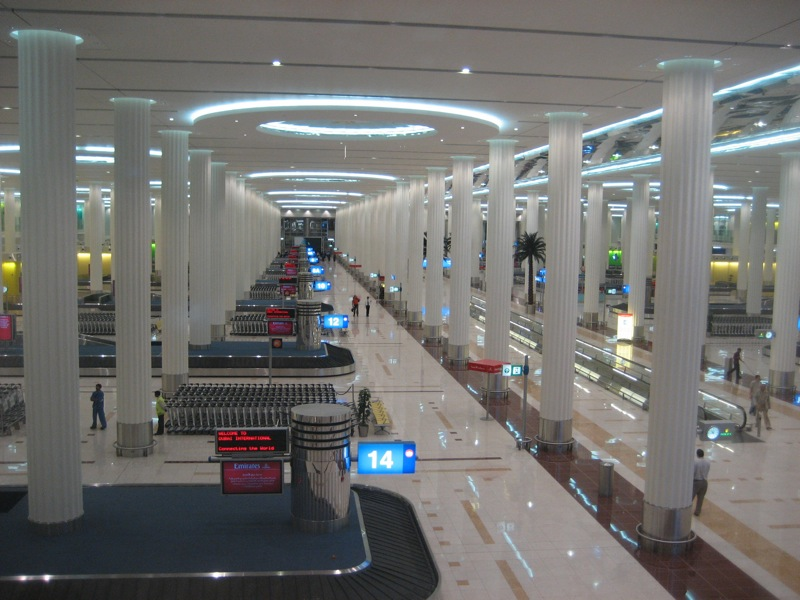
The baggage claim area in the arrivals hall of Terminal 3.

In departures, there are 126 check-in counters for economy class passengers, and 36 for first and business class passengers. Also, there are 18 self-service kiosks, 3 lounges for unaccompanied minors, 38 counters and 12 e-gates for Economy class passengers and 10 counters and 4 e-gates for First & Business class at immigration.

In arrivals, the terminal contains 52 immigration counters, 14 baggage carousels, and 12 e-gates (Electronic Passport Control System) used at all entry point into the United Arab Emirates. There are also 6 baggage carousels for oversized luggage.

The car park includes 1,870 car spaces, 163 car rental spaces, 44 Emirates bus spaces, a check-in hall for baggage with an area of 4,500 m^{2} (48,000 sq ft), a mosque with an area 950 m^{2} (10,200 sq ft) and 18 check-in counters. The entire car park has a total area of 177,500 m^{2} (1,911,000 sq ft).

On 7 September 2010, Terminal 3 saw its 50 millionth passenger pass through the terminal. Since opening in October 2008, the terminal has handled more than 197,920 flight movements (departures and arrivals), 50 million passengers and some 70 million pieces of luggage. Currently, some 85,000 passengers pass through this terminal every day.

=== Passenger flights ===
Airlines	Destinations
Air Canada	Toronto-Pearson, Vancouver
Emirates	Abidjan, Abuja, Accra, Addis Ababa, Adelaide, Ahmedabad, Algiers, Amman-Queen Alia, Amsterdam, Athens, Auckland, Baghdad, Bahrain, Bangalore, Bangkok-Suvarnabhumi, Barcelona, Basra, Beijing-Capital, Beirut, Birmingham (UK), Boston, Brisbane, Brussels, Budapest, Buenos Aires-Ezeiza, Cairo, Cape Town, Casablanca, Chennai, Chicago-O'Hare, Christchurch, Clark, Colombo, Conakry, Copenhagen, Dakar, Dallas/Fort Worth, Dammam, Dar es Salaam, Delhi, Denpasar, Dhaka, Doha, Dublin, Durban, Düsseldorf, Entebbe, Erbil, Frankfurt, Geneva, Glasgow, Guangzhou, Hamburg, Harare, Ho Chi Minh City, Hong Kong, Houston-Intercontinental, Hyderabad, Islamabad, Istanbul-Atatürk, Jakarta-Soekarno-Hatta, Jeddah, Johannesburg, Kabul, Karachi, Khartoum, Kochi, Kolkata, Kozhikode, Kuala Lumpur–International, Kuwait, Kyiv-Boryspil, Lagos, Lahore, Larnaca, Lisbon, London-Gatwick, London-Heathrow, London-Stansted, Los Angeles, Luanda, Lusaka, Lyon, Madrid, Mahé, Malé, Malta, Manchester (UK), Manila, Mauritius, Medina, Melbourne, Milan-Malpensa, Montreal-Trudeau, Moscow-Domodedovo, Mumbai, Munich, Muscat, Nairobi-Jomo Kenyatta, Newark, Newcastle, New York-JFK, Nice, Osaka-Kansai, Oslo-Gardermoen, Paris-Charles de Gaulle, Perth, Peshawar, Phuket, Prague, Rio de Janeiro-Galeão, Riyadh, Rome-Fiumicino, San Francisco, Sanaa, São Paulo-Guarulhos, Seattle/Tacoma, Seoul-Incheon, Shanghai-Pudong, Sialkot, Singapore, Saint Petersburg, Stockholm-Arlanda, Sydney, Taipei-Taoyuan, Tehran-Imam Khomeini, Tripoli, Thiruvananthapuram, Tokyo-Haneda, Tokyo-Narita, Toronto-Pearson, Tunis, Venice-Marco Polo, Vienna, Warsaw-Chopin, Washington-Dulles, Yangon, Zurich
flydubai	Almaty, Basel, Basra, Belgrade, Bishkek, Bucharest, Catania, Dar es Salaam, Entebbe, Helsinki, Kilimanjaro, Krabi, Kraków, Naples, Nur-Sultan, Prague, Salalah, Sofia, Tashkent, Yangon, Zanzibar; Seasonal: Mineralnye Vody, Rostov-on-Don, Zagreb
United Airlines	Newark

== Ground transportation ==
=== Rail ===
Terminal 3 is served by Dubai Metro, which operates two lines through or near the Terminal. The Red Line has a station at each of Terminal 3. Services run between 6 am and 11 pm every day except Friday, when they run between 1 pm and midnight. These timings differ during the Islamic holy month of Ramadan. The station is located in front of Terminal 3, and can be accessed directly from the arrivals areas.

== See also ==
- Dubai International Airport
- Tourism in Dubai
- Emirates (airline)
