= Dubai International Airport Automated People Mover =

Driverless people mover

Overview
- Locale: Dubai International Airport, Dubai, United Arab Emirates
- Transit type: People mover
- Number of lines: 2
- Number of stations: 4

Operation
- Began operation: Terminal 3 APM: January 2013; Terminal 1 APM: 2016
- Operator: Serco Group plc.

Technical
- System length: Terminal 3 APM: 5.2 km (3.2 mi); Terminal 1 APM: 1.5 km (0.93 mi)

The Dubai International Airport Automated People Mover is a driverless people mover located within Dubai International Airport. It operates in two "segments" within Terminal 3 and Concourse A & B, often referred to as the Terminal 3 APM, and between Terminals 1 and Concourse D will referred to as the Terminal 1 APM.

== Terminal 3 APM ==
The first segment runs between the Terminal 3 and the Airbus A380 dedicated Concourse A. The segment transports departing passengers to their A380 gates, and transports arriving passengers to the passport and immigration section of Terminal 3. This segment uses the Mitsubishi Crystal Mover system and opened in January 2013. It has two stations.

== Terminal 1 APM ==
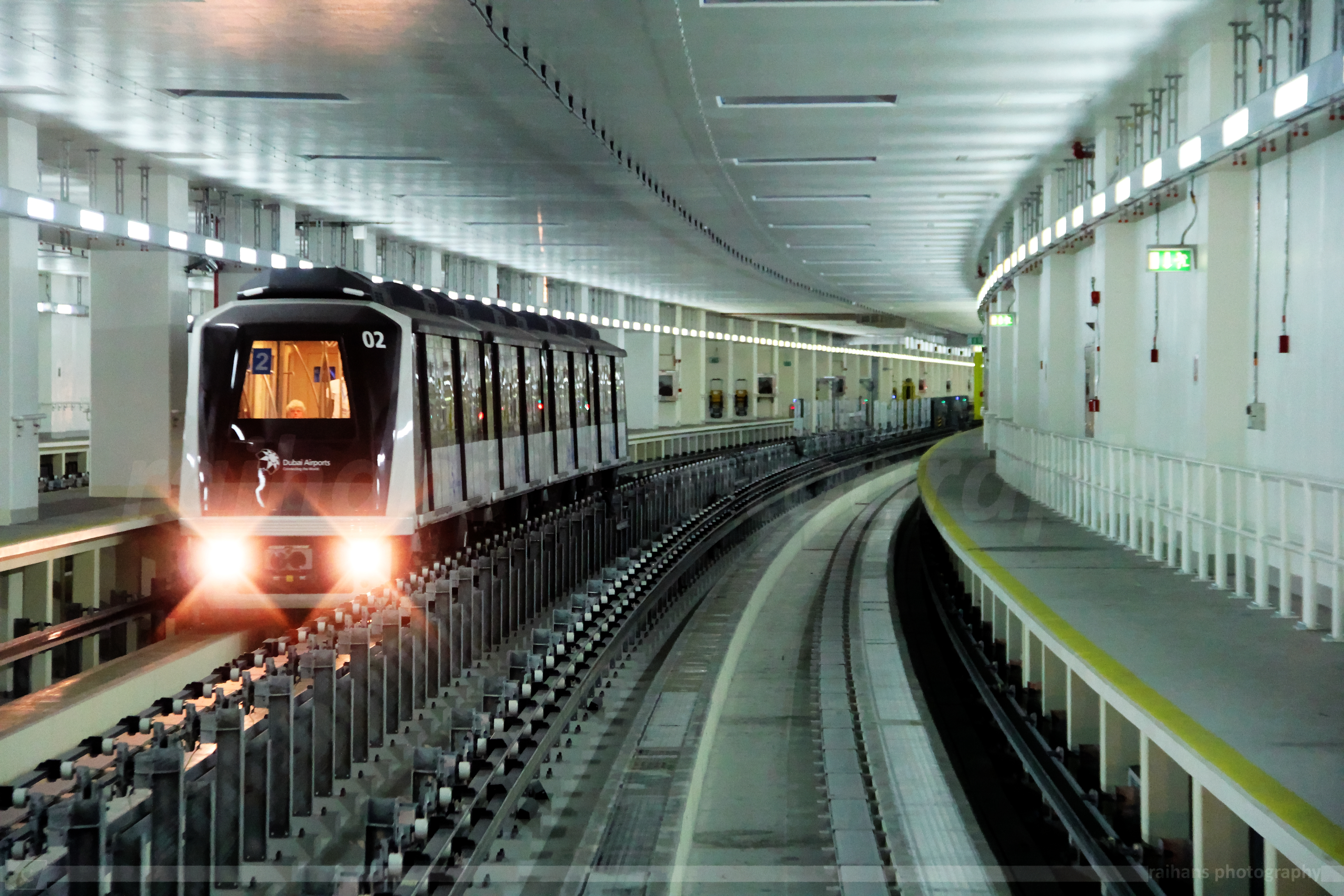
Dubai International Airport Automated People Mover

The second segment of the system runs from the Terminal 1 to Concourse D. This segment currently uses Bombardier Innovia APM 300 trams. It has two stations.
