= Taoyuan International Airport Skytrain =

Taoyuan International Airport Skytrain 桃園國際機場旅客自動電車輸送系統
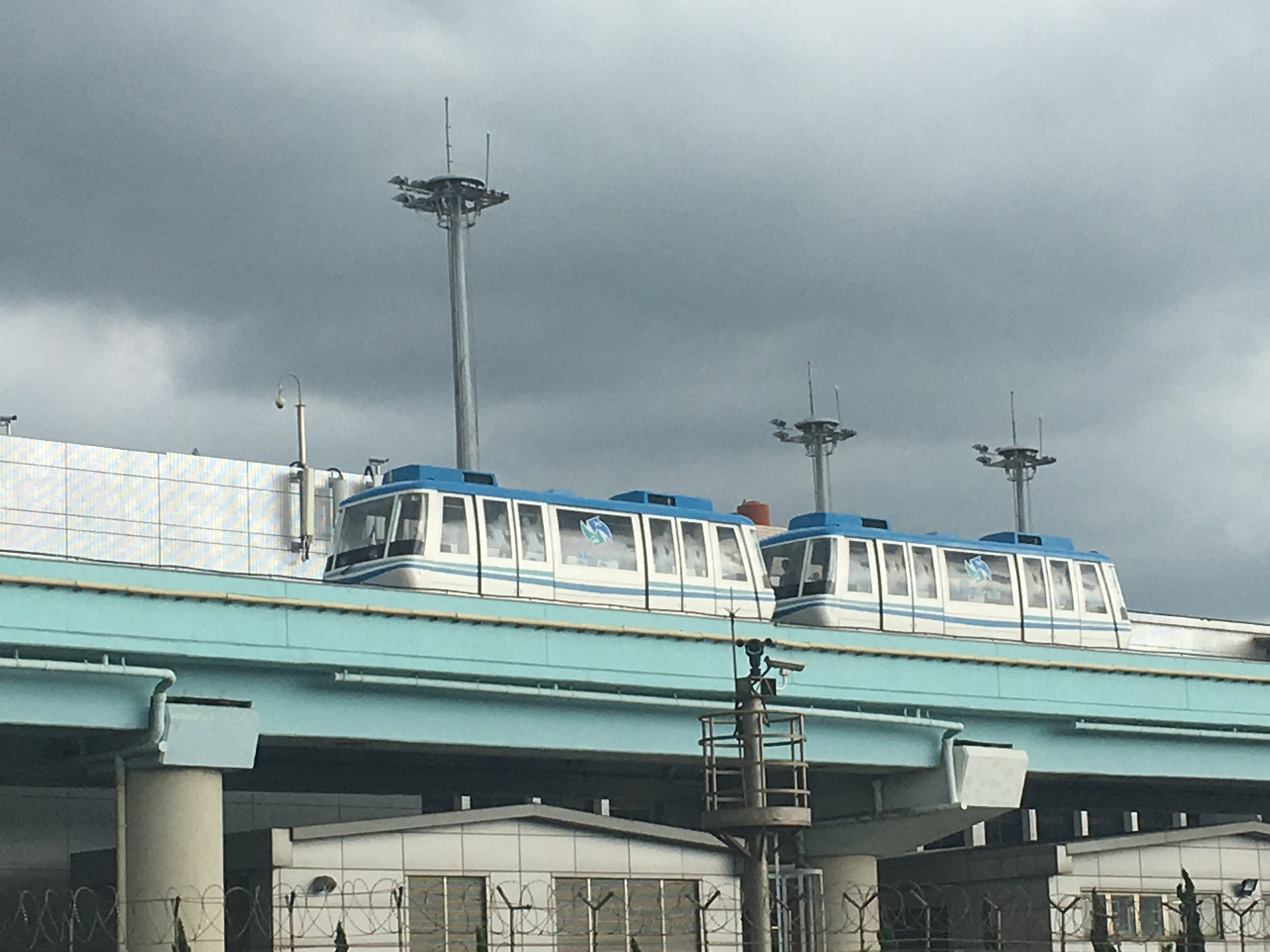

Overview
- Locale: Taiwan Taoyuan International Airport, Taoyuan, Taiwan
- Transit type: People mover
- Number of lines: 2
- Number of stations: 2

Operation
- Operator: Taoyuan International Airport Corporation

Technical
- Electrification: 600 V 60 Hz 3-phase AC third rail
- Top speed: 40 km/h (25 mph) (57 km/h (35 mph) design max)

Taoyuan International Airport Skytrain (Chinese: 桃園國際機場旅客自動電車輸送系統) is a people mover system that runs between the two passenger terminal buildings at the Taoyuan International Airport. The system consists of two parallel tracks, North and South, each providing bidirectional service.

The north track is served by a single car for passport controlled passengers only. The south track serves both passport controlled passengers and the general public, separated by platform dividers between the cars.

An extension is underway towards the future third terminal building, at which time the skytrain service will be limited to airport staff and passport-checked passengers only. The Taoyuan Airport MRT is to serve general public access between the terminals, the Airport Hotel, and the Taoyuan-Taipei area.

== Frequency ==
- Peak (06:00~22:00): 2-4 min
- Off-peak (22:00~00:00): 4-8 min
- Night service: On demand

== Technical details ==
- Acceleration: 0.97 m/s^{2} (3.2 ft/s^{2})
- Deceleration:
  - Service: 1.1 m/s^{2} (3.6 ft/s^{2})
  - Emergency: 1.7 m/s^{2} (5.6 ft/s^{2})
- Capacity: 69 passengers (8 seated, 61 standing)
- Vehicle length: 10.5 m (34 ft 5 in)
- Vehicle width: 2.69 m (8 ft 10 in)
- Vehicle height: 3,745 mm (12 ft 3.4 in)
- Interior height: 2,045 mm (6 ft 8.5 in)
- Manufacturer: Niigata Transys
