= Allegheny County Fairgrounds =

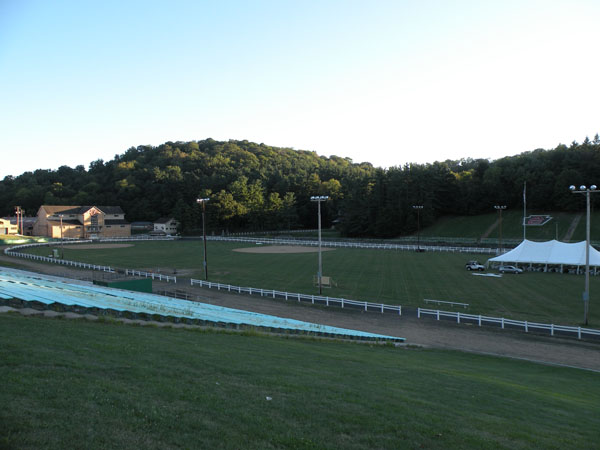

- Location of Allegheny County Fairgrounds in Allegheny County, Pennsylvania
- 40°18′12.46″N 79°59′50.19″W
- Location: South Park, South Park Township, Pennsylvania, USA

History
- Built: 1927

Pittsburgh Landmark – PHLF
- Designated: 2009

Allegheny County Fairgrounds located in South Park in South Park Township, Pennsylvania, was acquired and designed for use in 1927 by the Allegheny County Department of Parks. Beginning in 1932, this was the location of the Allegheny County Fair. It was added to the List of Pittsburgh History and Landmarks Foundation Historic Landmarks in 2009.
