= Tampa International Airport People Movers =

Set of automated people mover systems

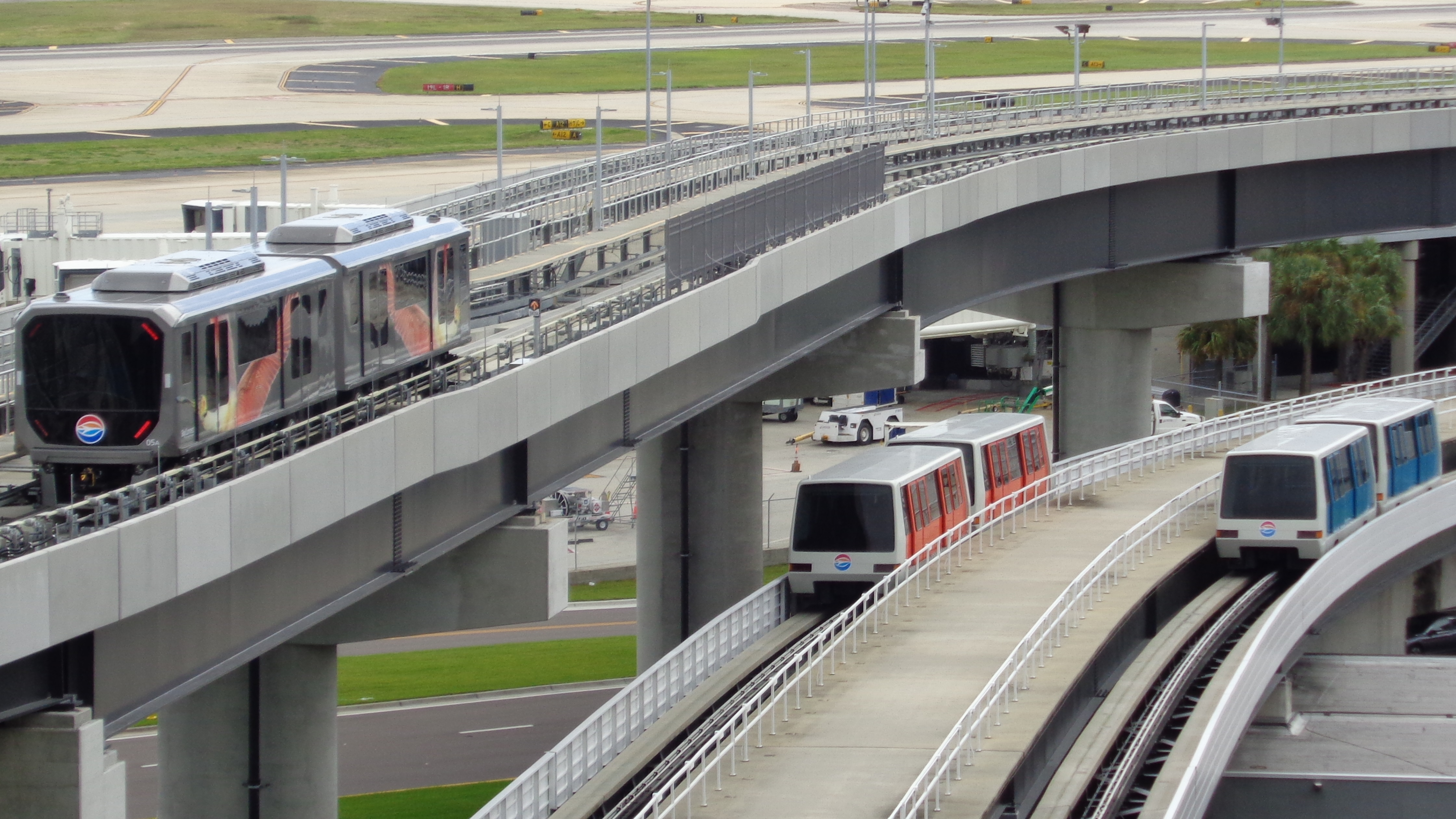
- SkyConnect (left) and Airside A (right) people movers

Overview
- Locale: Tampa International Airport
- Stations: 11

Service
- Type: Automated guideway transit
- Services: 5
- Rolling stock: 16 Bombardier Innovia APM 100 vehicles (airside systems); 6 Bombardier Innovia Monorail 100 vehicles (monorail); 12 Mitsubishi Crystal Mover vehicles (SkyConnect)

History
- Opened: 1971 (airside systems); 1991 (monorail); 2018 (SkyConnect)
- Closed: 2020 (monorail)

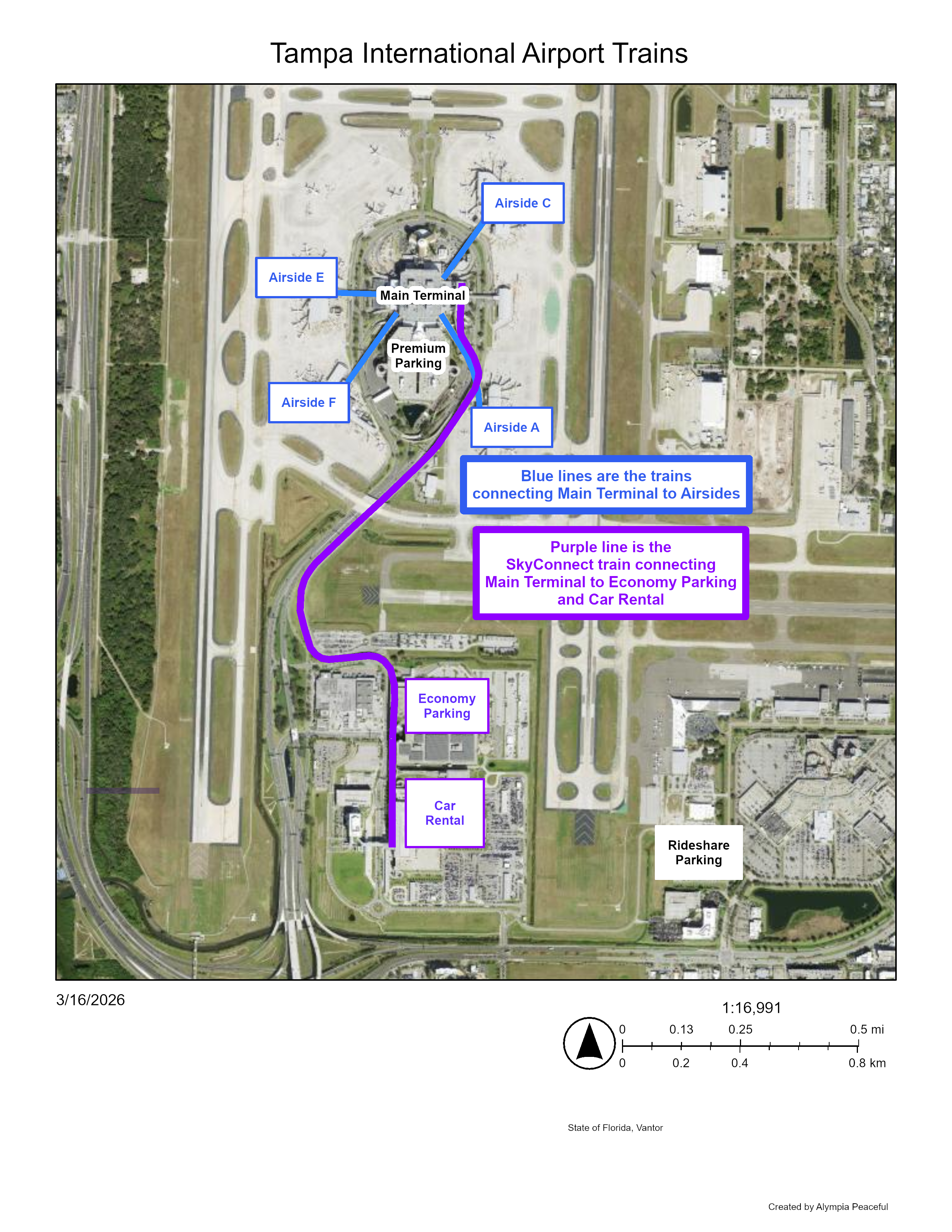
Tampa International Airport train lines

The Tampa International Airport People Movers are a set of automated people mover systems operating within Tampa International Airport. The primary set of people movers are automated guideway transit (AGT) systems that connect the airport's main terminal to four satellite airside concourses. Opened in 1971, the landside/airside shuttles were the first people movers used to transport passengers within an airport terminal. A fifth people mover line known as SkyConnect, which began operating in 2018, connects the main terminal with the airport's economy parking garage and rental car center. In addition, a monorail once connected the main terminal and the long-term parking garage from 1991 until its closure in 2020.

== Landside/Airside shuttles ==
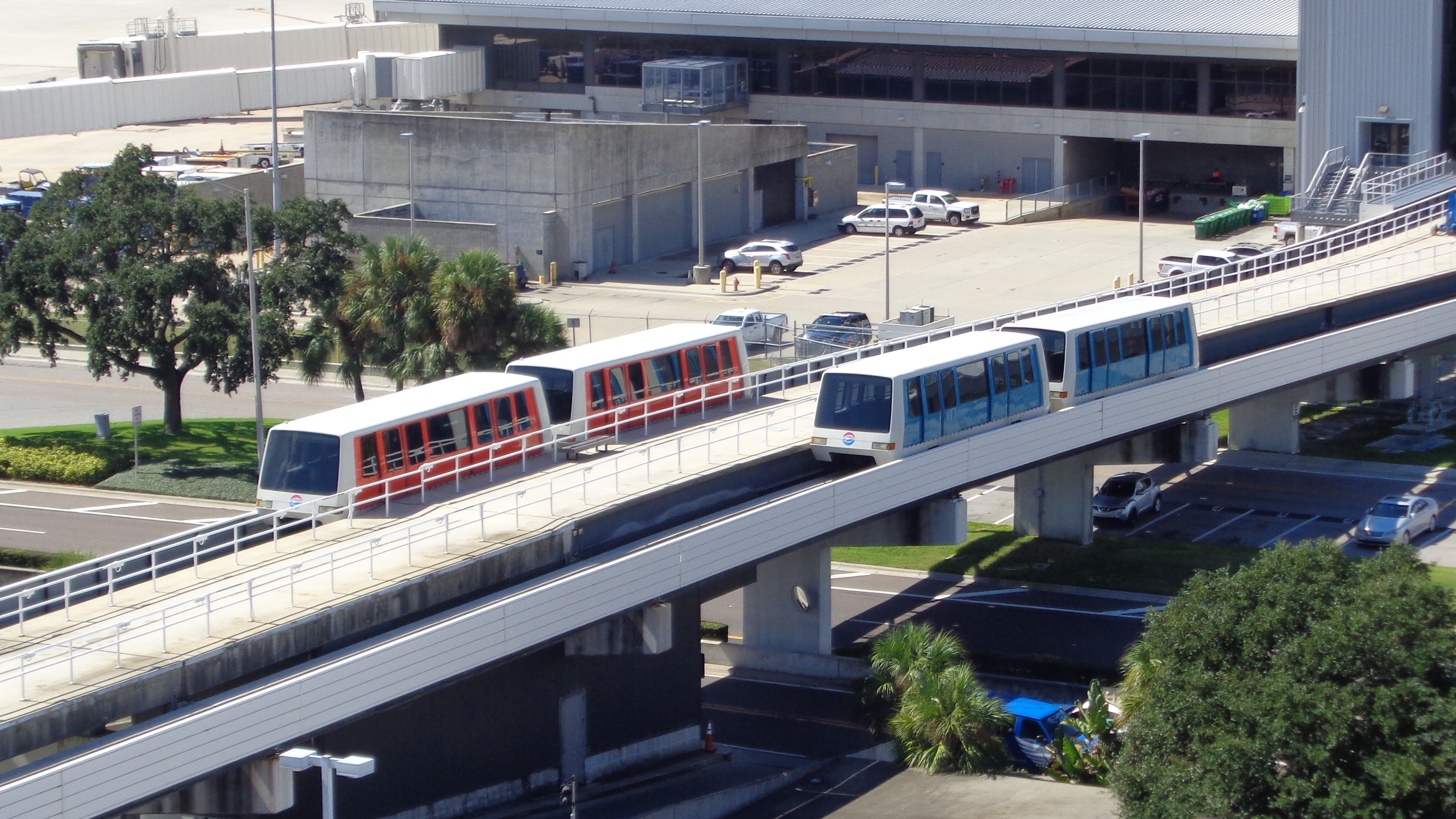
Current Airside E guideway and vehicles

The four currently operating airside automated guideway transit (AGT) people mover systems operate as shuttles connecting the main terminal on Level 3 to airside concourses A, C, E, and F. Each airside has its own line, which consists of two guideways with an emergency walkway between them (which can be used to evacuate a shuttle or for people to walk should the shuttles fail). On each line, the two guideways each carry a two-car train (one red train and one blue train) consisting of Innovia APM 100 vehicles built by Bombardier Transportation. The shuttles simply run back and forth between the main terminal and the airsides buildings. Passengers board on an island platform between the two guideways and disembark on side platforms at both ends. All main terminal platforms contain platform screen doors, while the airside platforms contain steel doors. The vehicles are serviced at the airside stations where maintenance bays exist beneath the guideways.

Tampa Mayor Jane Castor delivers pre-recorded greetings to travelers on the shuttles as they run between the stations. Tampa's previous mayor Bob Buckhorn also provided these greetings during his tenure as Mayor of Tampa.

=== History ===
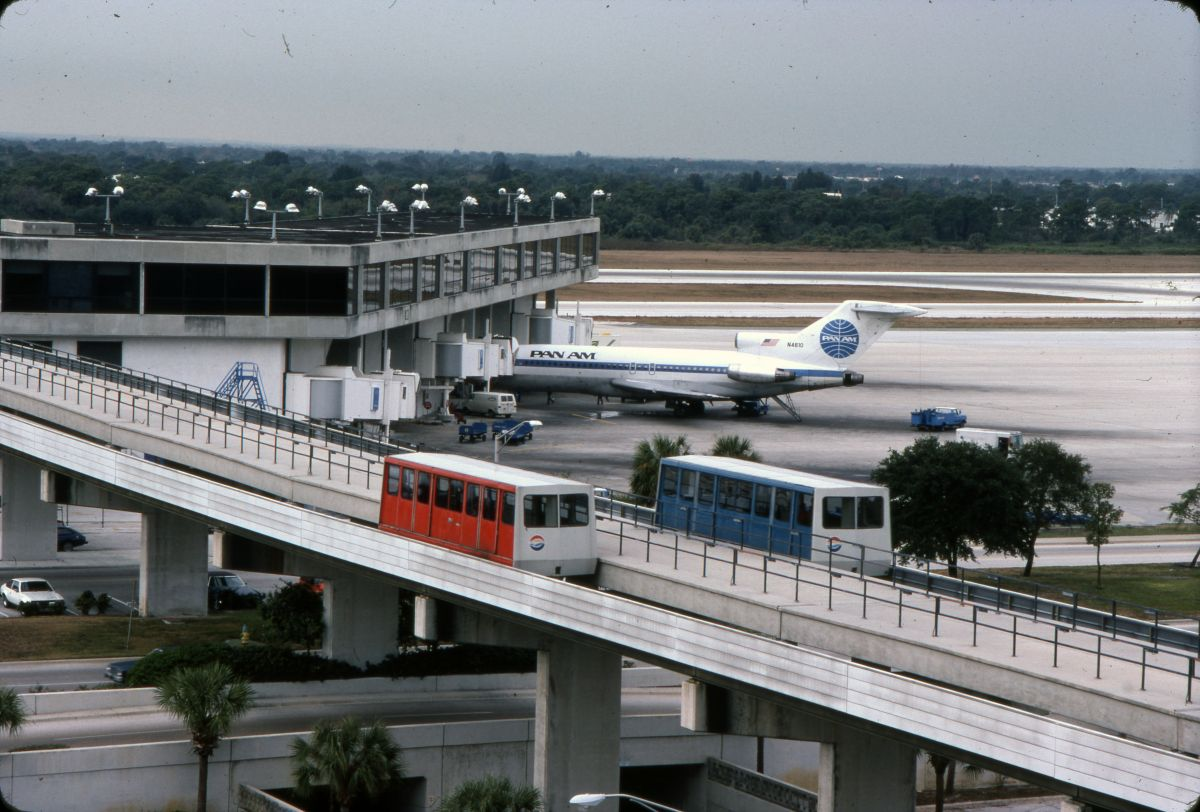
Original first-generation C-100 vehicles that operated from 1971 to 1996

When the terminal opened in 1971, the landside/airside shuttles were the first automated people mover systems to operate in an airport. The shuttles were originally built by Westinghouse Electric Corporation (who was also contracted to install the terminal's original elevators and escalators). Upon opening, the airport included lines to Airsides B, C, D, and E using eight first-generation Westinghouse C-100 vehicles (one vehicle on each guideway). Local WFLA radio personality Jack Harris provided the original voice for the audio announcements for the shuttles (and other announcements throughout the airport).

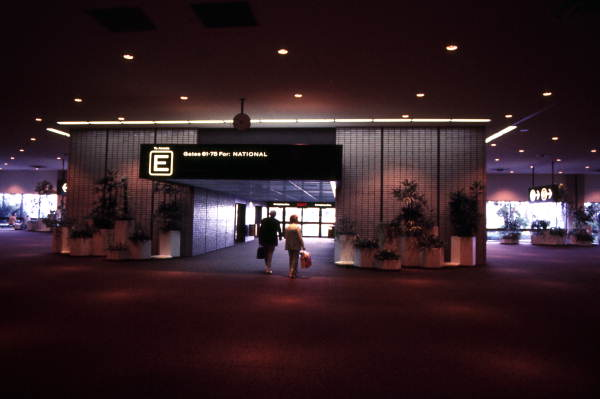
Terminal station for Airside E shuttle in 1975

Tampa International Airport's landside/airside design was the first of its type in the world, and the use of people movers to shuttle people between the landside terminal and airside concourses was a key part of keeping walking distances short. The airport's layout was so well received that it was largely replicated at Orlando International Airport (with people movers also built by Westinghouse) in 1981.

Airside F was added to the airport in 1987 along with an additional shuttle line. Airside F's shuttles included new second-generation C-100 vehicles, and it would be the first airside system to include two-car trains. Airside F's shuttle station was built on the second level of the airside building (the same level as the passenger boarding jetways) unlike the original airsides, which had their shuttle stations on the third level (the same as the landside terminal). This was due to the improved technology of the second-generation C-100 vehicles, which could better handle inclines than the original vehicles and it eliminated the need for passengers to descend a level to access aircraft. Every subsequent airside would have its shuttle station on the second level.

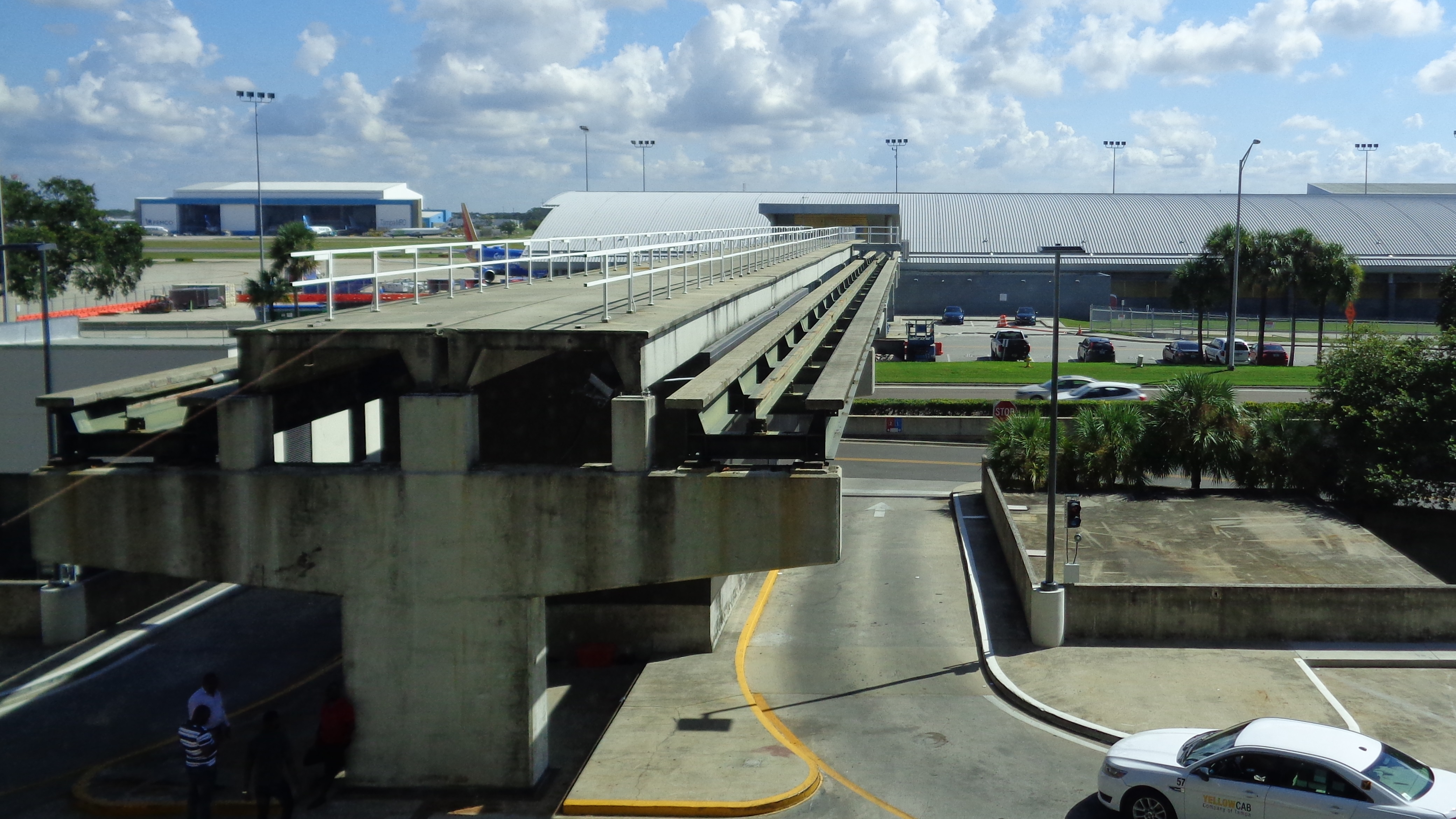
Defunct Airside B guideway

Airside B closed permanently in 1991. In lieu of reopening Airside B, Airside A was built in 1995. Airside A's shuttle system has operated with CX-100 vehicles (known today as the Innovia APM 100) since its opening and it operates with two-car trains. After its closure, Airside B's shuttles remained dormant on the guideway until the airside was demolished in 2003. Despite the demolition, part of the shuttle guideway to the former Airside B still remains abandoned at the airport today.

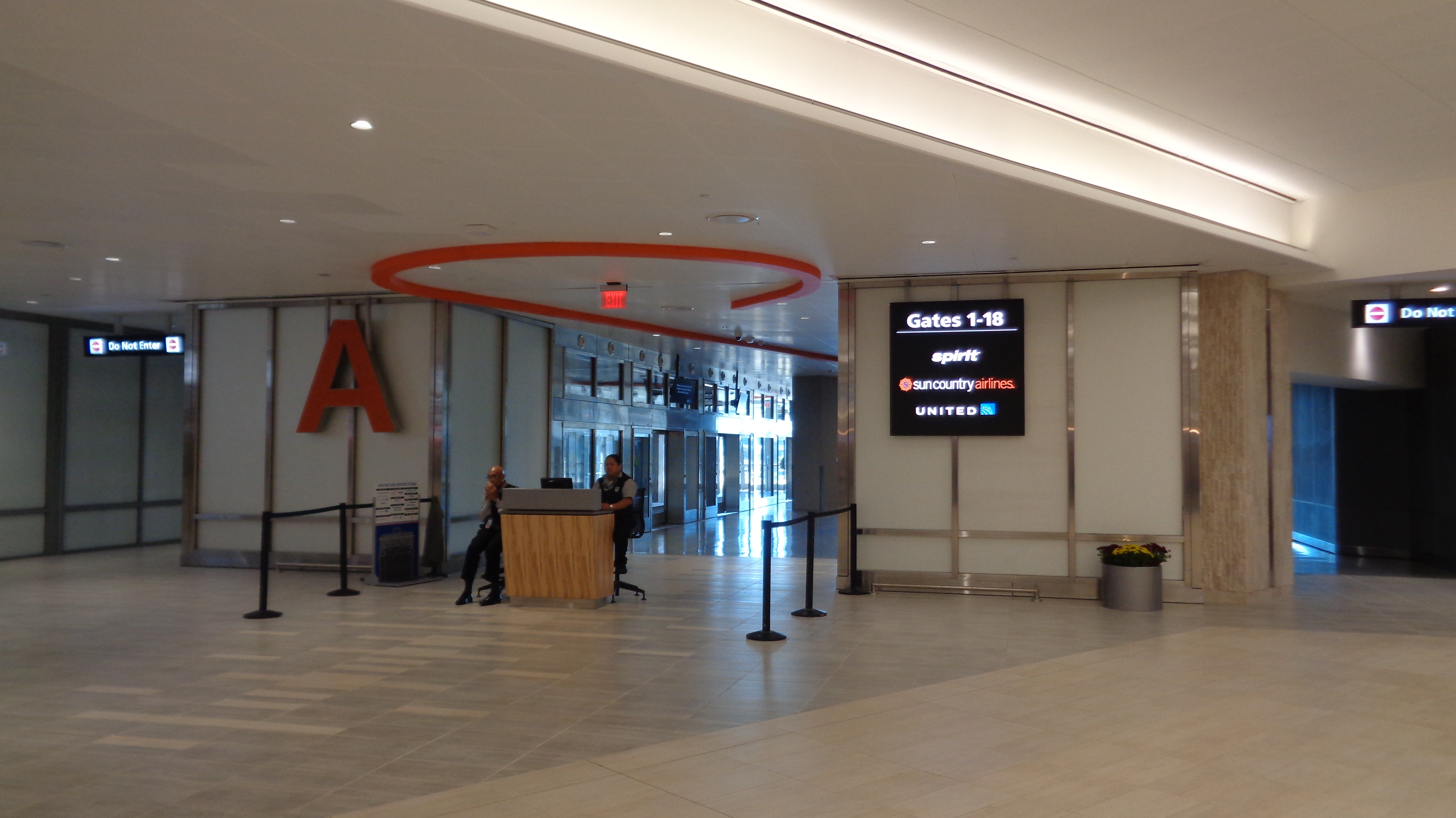
Terminal entrance to Airside A system after the 2018 renovation to the main terminal

In 1996, the original Airside C and Airside D were renovated. As part of the renovation, the original vehicles on their people movers were replaced with CX-100 vehicles along with other upgrades to the systems. Upon completion of the renovations, the original Airside E closed which led to the retirement of the last of the airport's original C-100 vehicles.

Airside E was rebuilt in 2002, and its new shuttles included CX-100 vehicles running in two-car trains. Airside C was then demolished and rebuilt. Much of the original guideways for both Airside C and E were reused for their new airside buildings. Airside C's CX-100 vehicles, which were installed in 1996, were refurbished during the reconstruction and resumed service when the rebuilt Airside C opened in April 2005.

One month after Airside C reopened, Airside D closed permanently. Airside D's CX-100 vehicles, which were also installed in 1996, were refurbished and were relocated to Airside C, where they were used to expand the existing shuttles to two-car trains. Airside D was demolished in 2007, though much of the shuttle infrastructure was left in place until 2019.

Airside F's second-generation C-100 vehicles were replaced with CX-100 vehicles by Bombardier (who had since acquired the remains of Westinghouse's transportation department) in 2008.

In 2018, work was complete to remodel the main terminal. As part of the renovation, the shuttle stations were rebuilt and moved outward to give the center of the building more space on Level 3. The rebuilt stations include glass platform screen doors in contrast with the metal doors of the earlier stations. The Airside D shuttle station, which had been simply blocked off with a shoe shine stand since its closure, was also removed at the same time and was replaced with a food court. The rest of the Airside D guideway was demolished in 2019.

=== Future ===
Tampa International Airport is preparing to build a replacement Airside D, which includes a new Airside D shuttle system. Construction is underway on a new shuttle station in the main terminal and the new Airside is set to be complete in 2028.

The airport is also in the process of replacing the shuttle vehicles on Airsides A and C (which have been in service since the mid 1990s). Alstom, which acquired Bombardier's transportation division in 2021, will supply the new Innovia APM 300R trains which will debut in 2025. The project will also rehabilitate the guideways as well. The Innovia APM 300R vehicles will also be used on the new Airside D shuttle system. The airport also plans to replace Airside E and Airside F's shuttles with new Innovia APM 300R by the end of the decade.

== SkyConnect ==
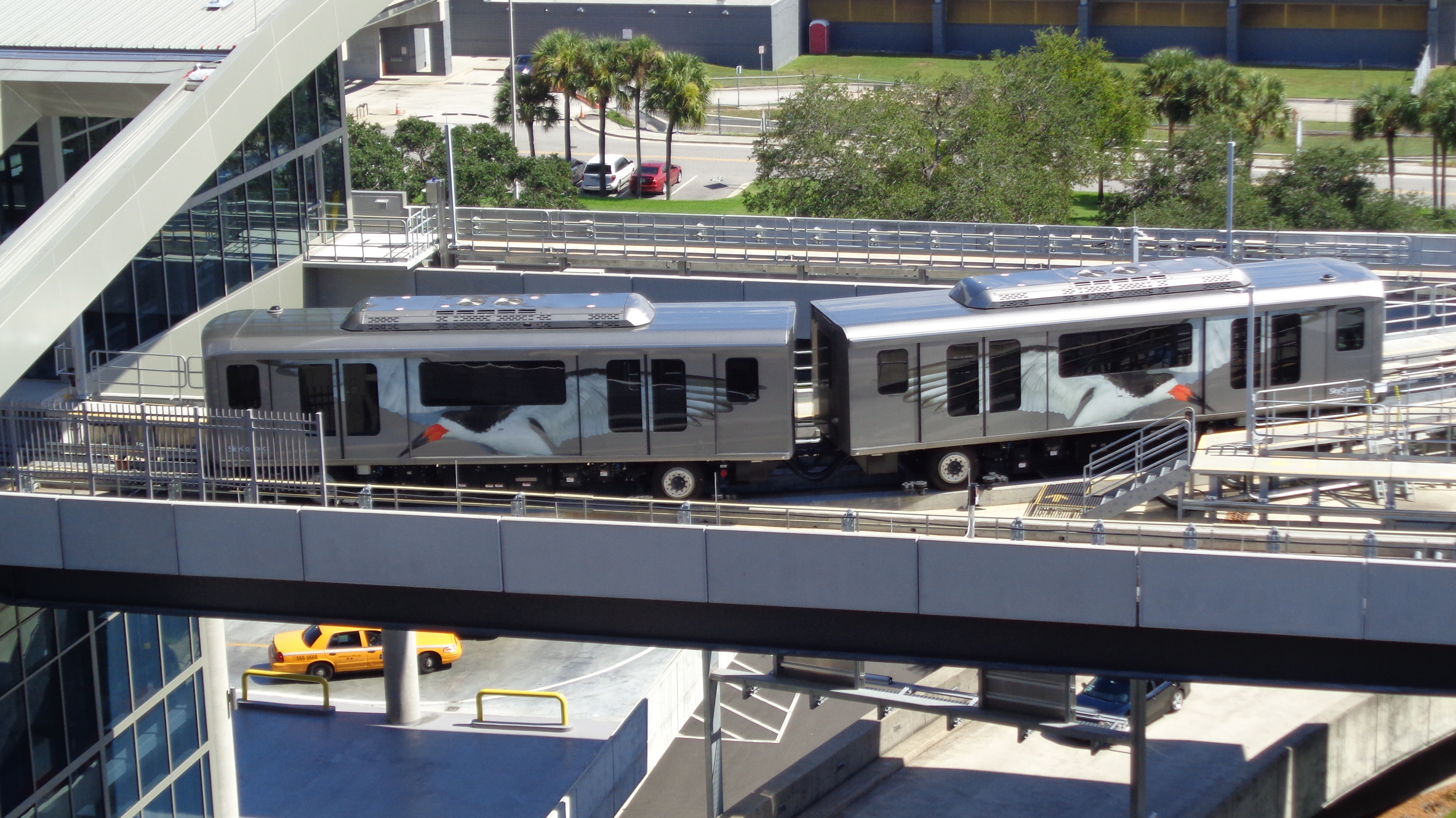
SkyConnect vehicles

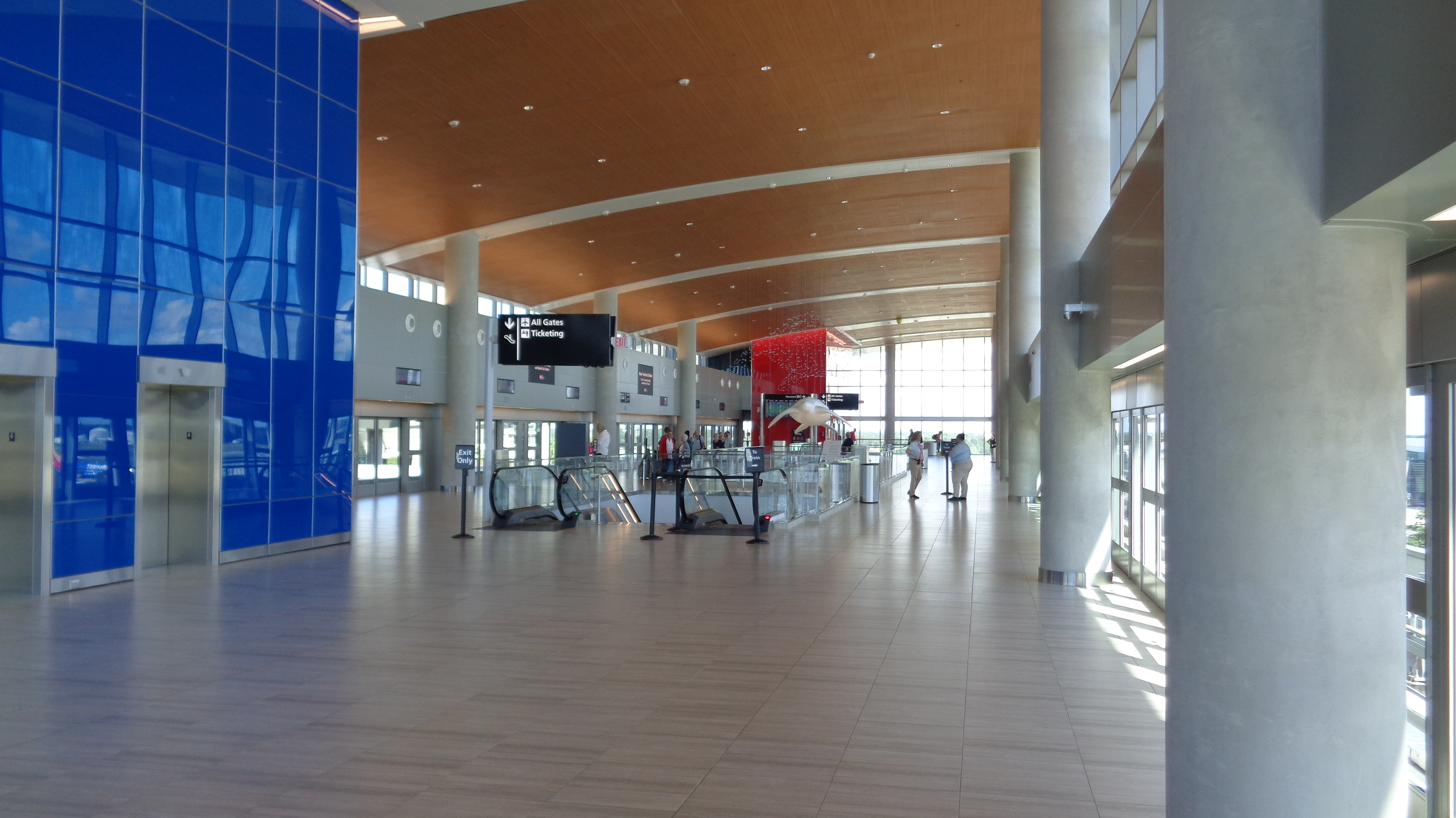
SkyConnect main terminal station

An additional people mover line named SkyConnect connects the main terminal with the rental car center and the economy parking garage. SkyConnect has three stations: one on Level 4 of the main terminal (right above the former station for the shuttle line to Airside B), the economy parking garage, and the rental car center (which includes access to low-cost rentals and a remote curbside). The guideway primarily runs along the airport's entrance road, George J. Bean Parkway, and passes underneath Taxiway J to connect with rental car and parking facilities. SkyConnect opened in 2018 and was built in conjunction with those facilities.

Unlike the landside/airside shuttles, SkyConnect uses Mitsubishi Crystal Mover vehicles. The trains run between the three stations in a pinched-loop configuration.

== Long-Term Parking Monorail (defunct) ==
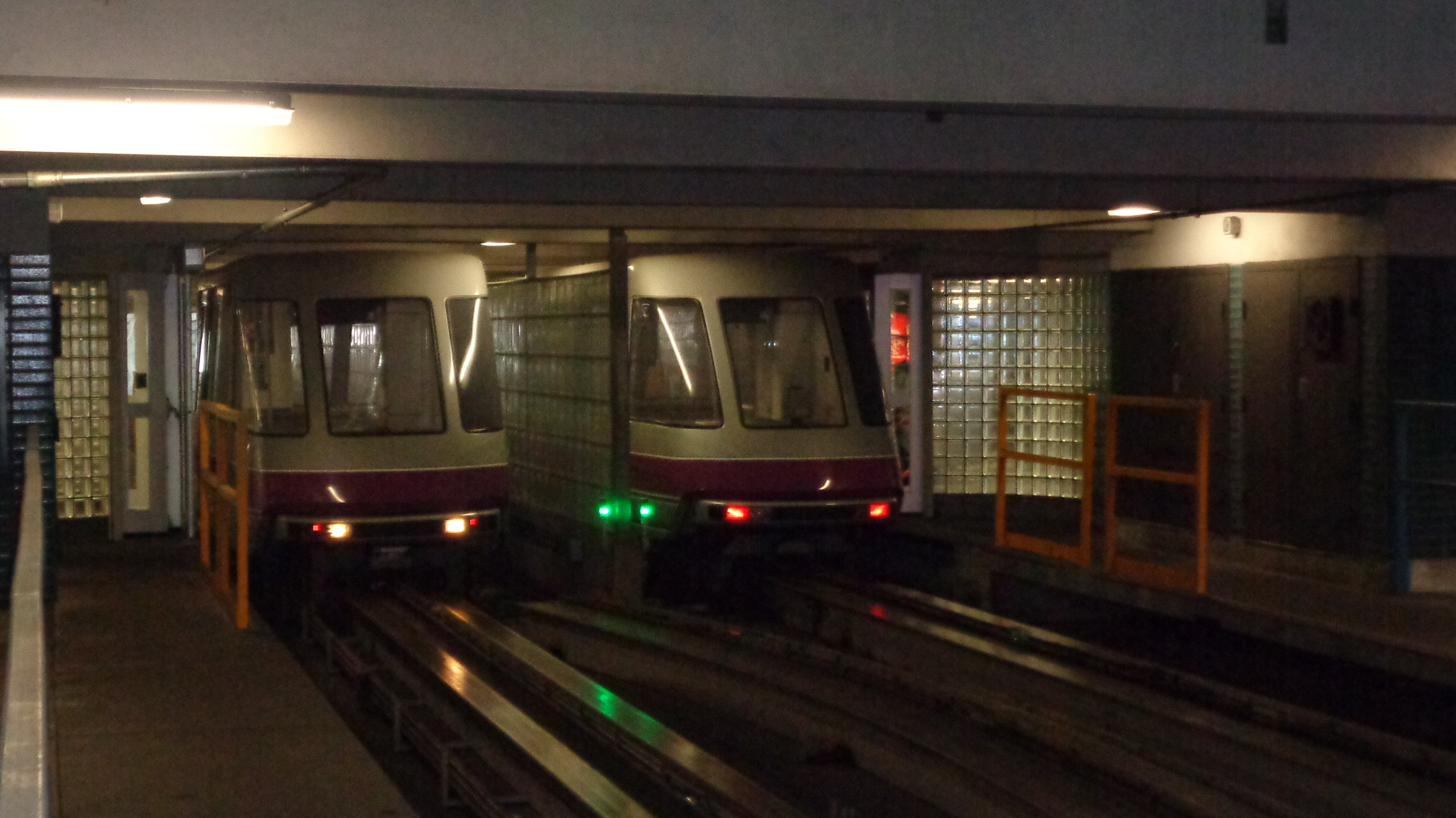
Monorail vehicles

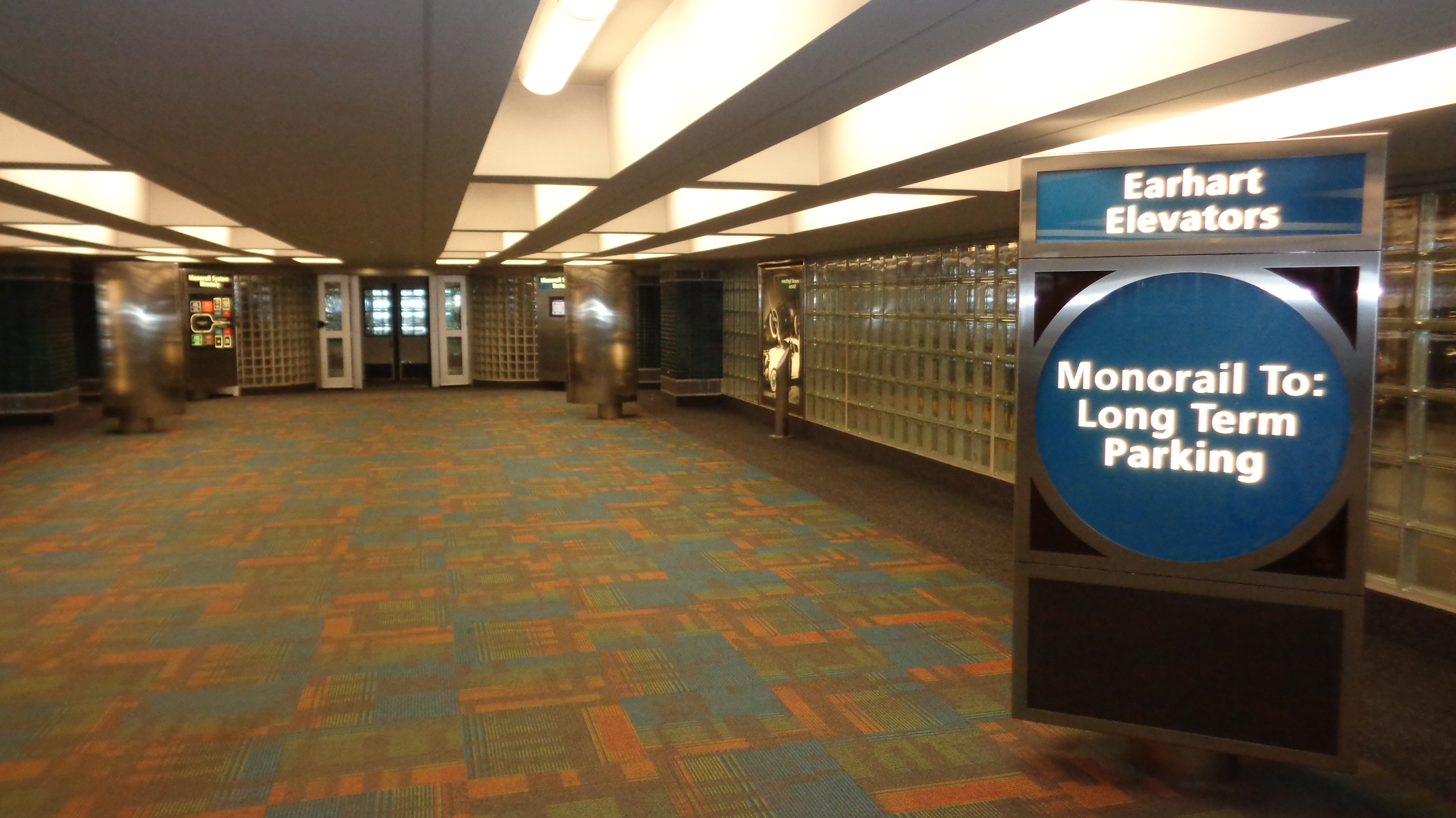
Monorail Amelia Earhart elevators station

An automated monorail system also once connected the main terminal on Level 5 to the long-term parking garage, stopping at each elevator bank in both buildings. It was installed in 1991 when the long-term parking garage was built. It used six Bombardier UM III vehicles (known today as the Innovia Monorail 100), which are also used on the Jacksonville Skyway.

The monorail was located on level 7 of the long-term parking garage, where it ran in a loop between the four elevator banks with stations at each bank. Once it completed the loop, it crossed a bridge onto level 5 of the short-term parking garage. In the short-term garage, it ran in a straight path between the four elevator banks, which passengers could use to access the terminal. The monorail made three stops in the short-term garage providing access to the four elevator banks before returning to the long-term garage and repeating the loop. Bombardier Transportation maintained the system by contract and it was monitored from the airport's communications center. The monorail ran 24 hours a day except for a once-a-week maintenance shut-down in the overnight hours. Thales Rail Signalling Solutions won a contract in 2008 to completely upgrade the computer control system.

Following the monorail's closure in early 2020, the airport opted not to invest in a replacement system due to high costs. Instead, a series of moving walkways are being constructed on Level 4 of the long term garage to allow passengers to access the main terminal more quickly via a bridge to Level 3 of the main terminal.

== See also ==
- Harbour Island People Mover
- Orlando International Airport People Movers
- List of airport people mover systems
