= Orlando International Airport People Movers =

Automated transit system

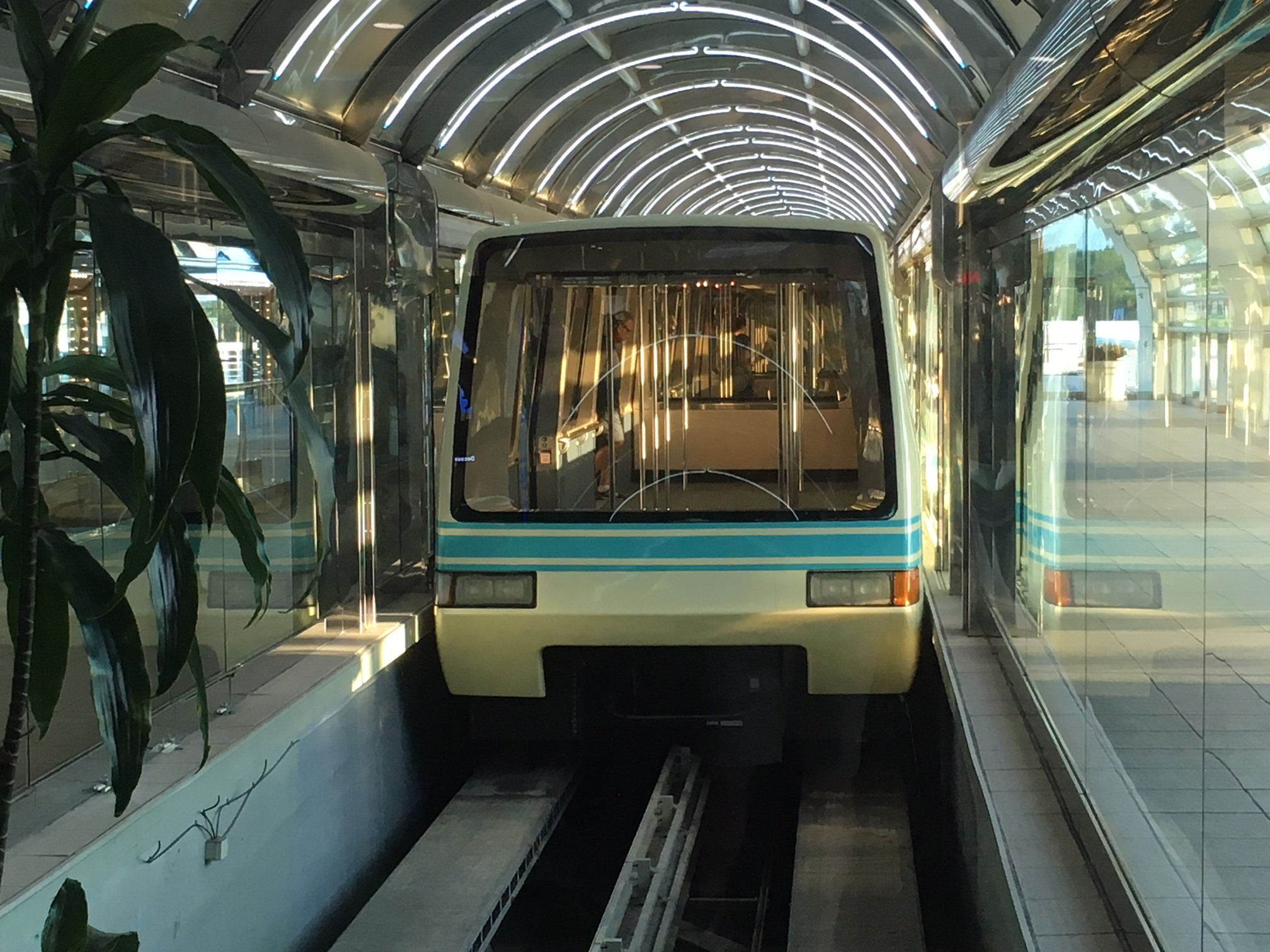
- Train at Airside 4 station in 2017

Overview
- Owner: Greater Orlando Aviation Authority
- Locale: Orlando International Airport
- Stations: 10

Service
- Type: Automated people mover (APM)
- Services: 5
- Rolling stock: 12 Bombardier CX-100 vehicles (Airsides 2 & 4); 20 Mitsubishi Crystal Mover vehicles (Airsides 1, 3 & Intermodal Terminal)

History
- Opened: 1981 (Airsides 1 & 3); 1990 (Airside 4); 2000 (Airside 2); 2017 (Intermodal Terminal)

Technical
- Character: Elevated

The Orlando International Airport People Movers are a set of five automated people movers (APMs) operating within Orlando International Airport.

Four of the systems, dubbed Gate Links, connect the airport's main terminal to four satellite airside concourses. The fifth, dubbed the Terminal Link, connects the main terminal to the Intermodal Terminal.

== Gate Links ==
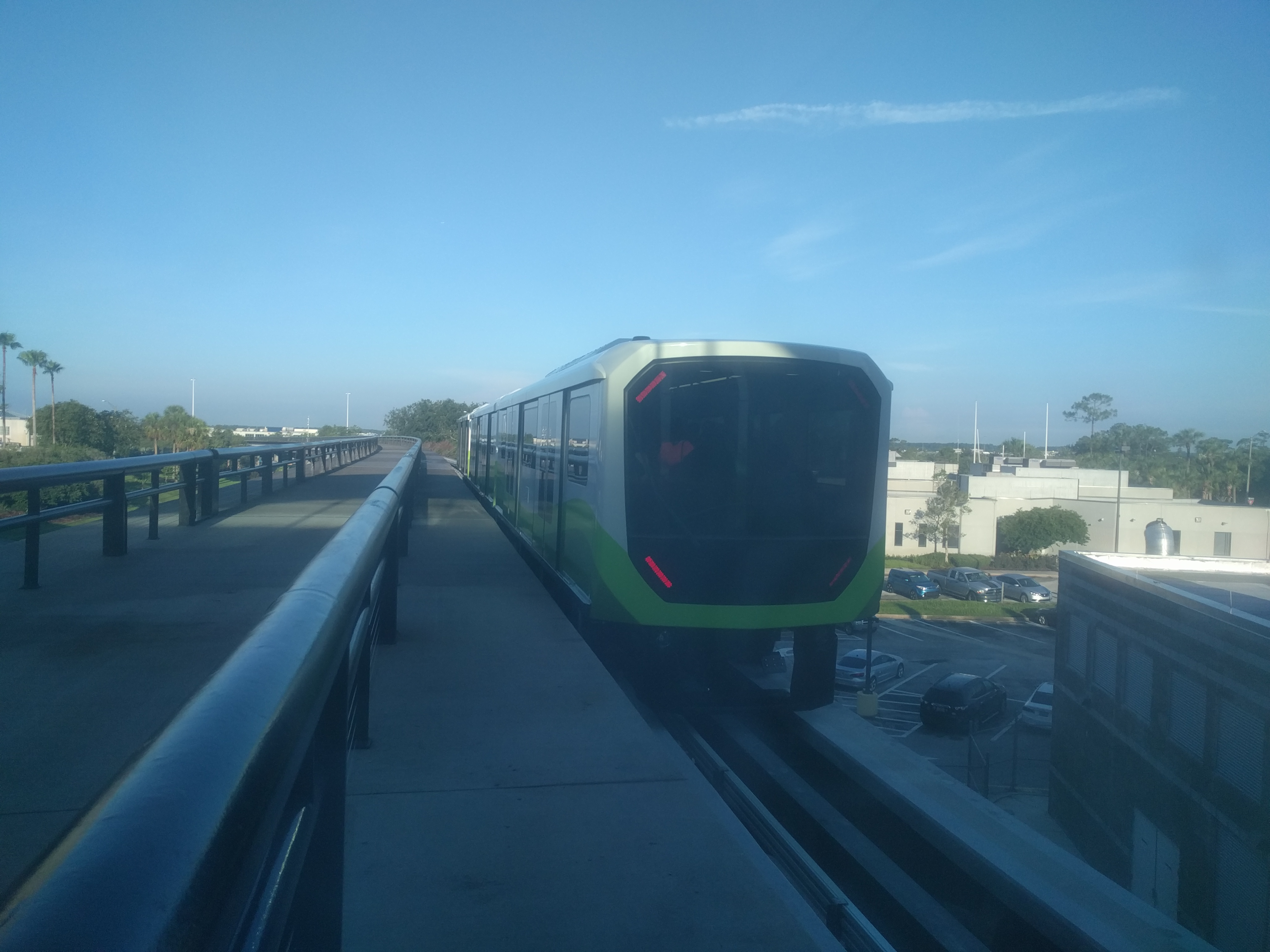
Mitsubishi Crystal Mover Urbanismo-22 on the Airside 3 APM in 2017

The Gate Links (formerly branded as shuttles or APMs) connect the landside of terminals A and B with the four satellite airside concourses. Each Gate Link system consists of two guideways that carry a three-car train each. The trains shuttle back and forth between the terminal and their respective airsides. The stations at the main terminal and the airsides use the Spanish solution: passengers board on an island platform between the two guideways and disembark on side platforms.

Since Airside 4 is the primary concourse for international flights, its system is set up so that when international flights arrive, terminal-bound passengers are not “secure”, while airside-bound passengers have gone through security screening. Only one set of doors are open at a time, and trains receive a security inspection before boarding secure departing passengers to the airside. This eliminates the need for international arriving passengers to go through additional security screening before heading to the main terminal.

Currently, Airsides 1 and 3 use a fleet of Mitsubishi Crystal Mover Urbanismo-22 vehicles, while the lines serving Airside 2 and 4 shuttle systems use Bombardier CX-100 vehicles. Orlando Mayor Buddy Dyer delivers greetings on all of the airside shuttles.

=== History ===
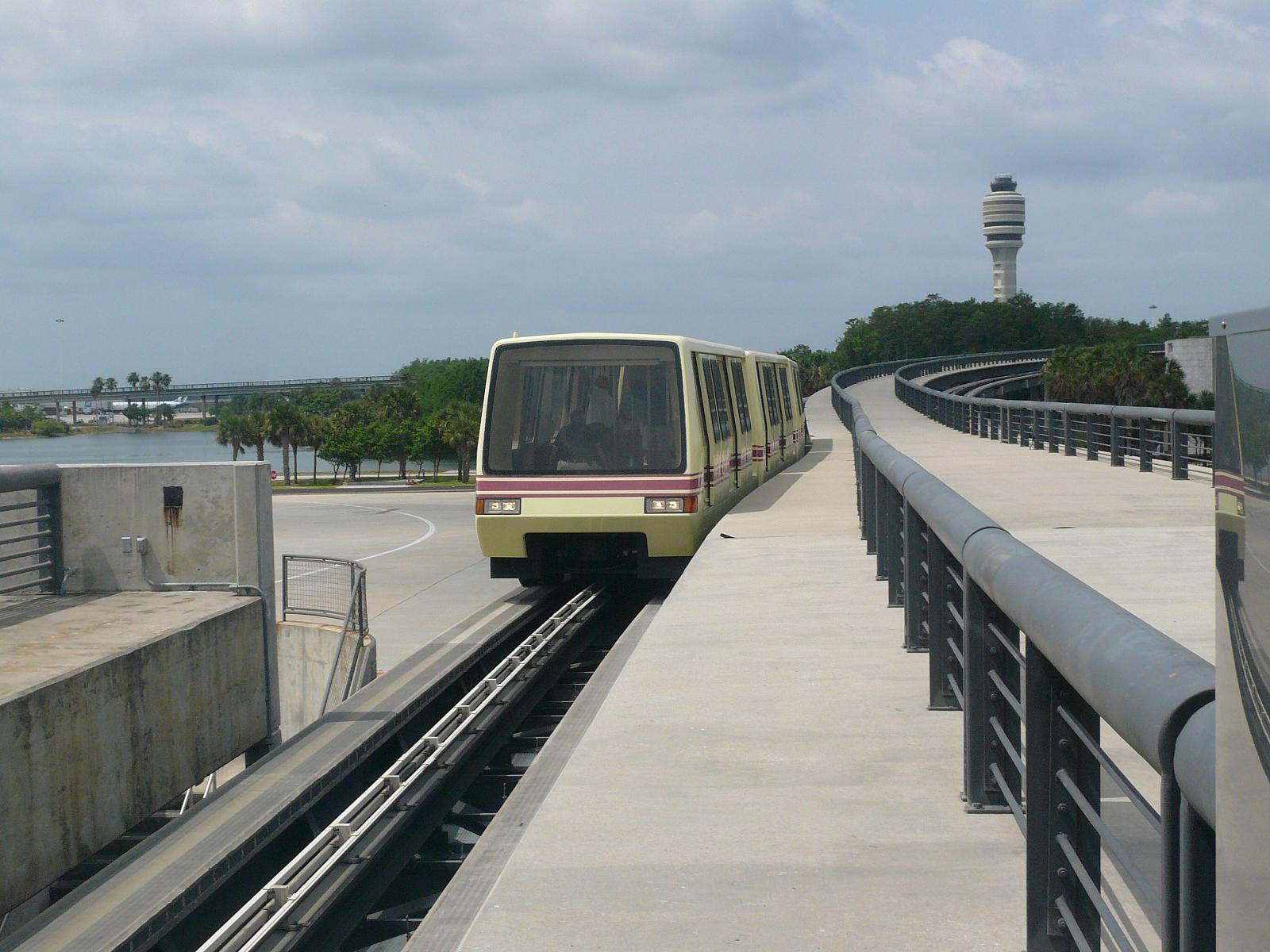
Bombardier CX-100 arriving at Airside 2 in 2008

Construction of the current terminal at Orlando International Airport began in 1978 and it opened in 1981. When the terminal opened, it only consisted of the western half of the landside terminal building and the two airsides on the west side of the terminal which contain Gates 1-59 (present-day Airsides 1 and 3). The Landside/Airside shuttle systems were built along with the terminal by Westinghouse Electric Corporation. The terminal's layout was based upon the design of Tampa International Airport, whose Landside/Airside shuttles were also built by Westinghouse. The lines to Airsides 1 and 3 originally consisted of eight of Westinghouse's second-generation C-100 vehicles, with two two-car trains running to each airside. The trains were later expanded to three cars.

The audio announcements on the airside shuttles when the airport opened featured the voice of Jack Wagner. Wagner is well known for his extensive voice work for the Walt Disney Company and he was the voice onboard the Walt Disney World Monorail System from 1971–1988 (though his voice still delivers the "please stand clear of the doors" on the monorails). Wagner's voice has largely been replaced on the Gate Links.

In 1990, the terminal was expanded to the east and Gates 60-99 (present-day Airside 4) along with its shuttle line were built. The Airside 4 line has operated with CX-100 vehicles (an updated version of the C-100) in three-car trains since its opening. A shuttle station and guideway for one additional airside was built during this expansion. However, the airside for Gates 100-129 (present-day Airside 2) was not built until 2000. Airside 2 also has three-car CX-100 shuttles.

In 2017, Airside 1 and 3 shuttles' original Westinghouse C-100 vehicles were retired, and replaced with the current Mitsubishi Crystal Mover Urbanismo-22 vehicles. The shuttles serving Airsides 2 and 4 still operate with their original CX-100 vehicles, though as of 2026, they are in the process of being replaced. When complete, the entire airport will have an all Mitsubishi people mover fleet by fall 2027.

== Terminal Link ==
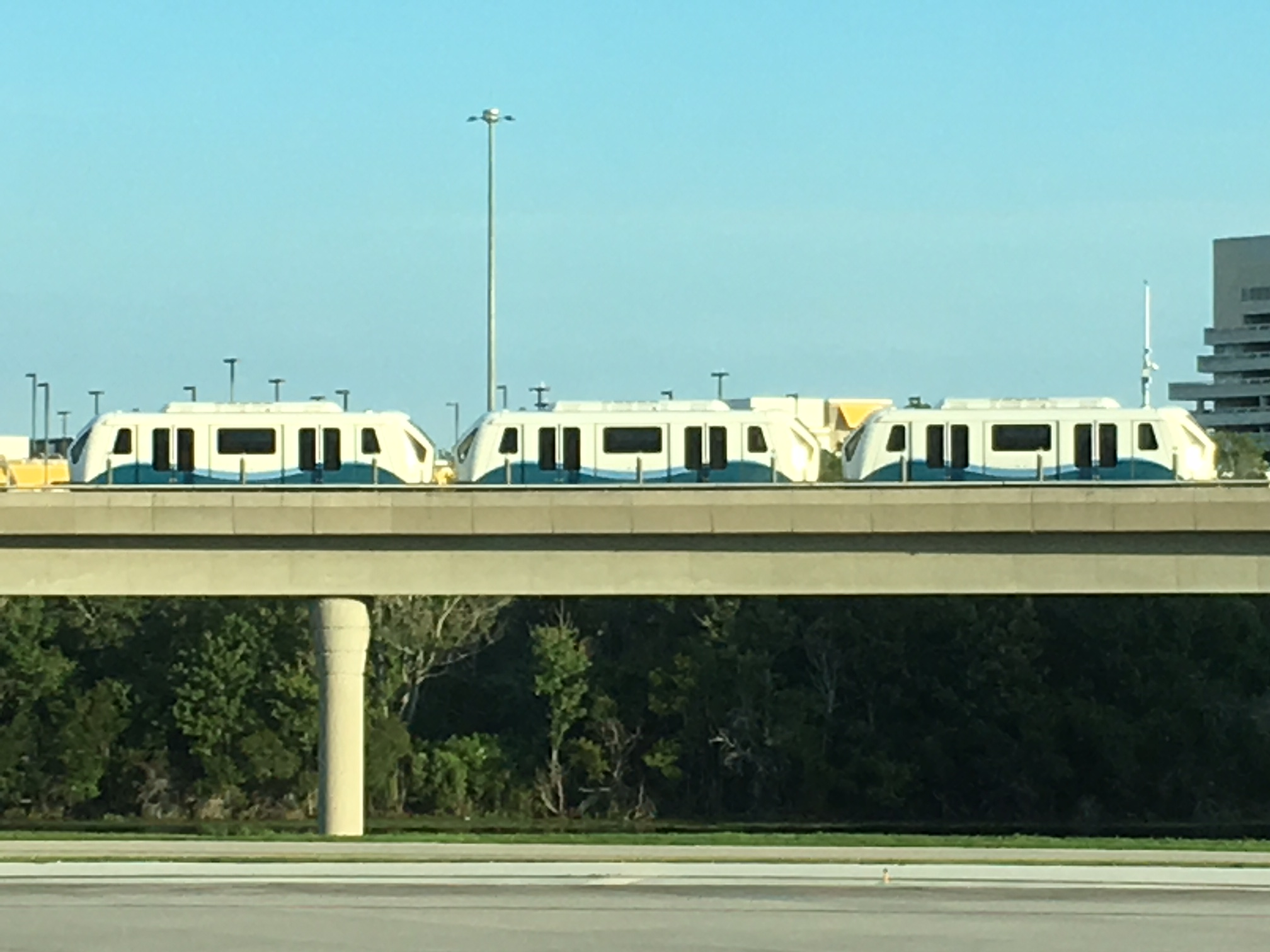
Mitsubishi Crystal Mover on the Intermodal Terminal line

The Terminal Link connects the landside of Terminals A and B with Terminal C and the airport's Intermodal Terminal. Terminal Link uses Mitsubishi Crystal Movers, although they heavily differ in appearance than those used for Airsides 1 and 3. Unlike the Gate Links, the Terminal Link runs in a pinched-loop configuration.

Terminal Link opened in 2017 along with the Intermodal Terminal. The Intermodal Terminal includes the station for Brightline, which began service in 2023, and it is also planned to be part of an expansion of SunRail in the future. The Intermodal Terminal (where the Terminal Link station is located) and Terminal C are connected by a pedestrian bridge.

== See also ==
- List of airport people mover systems
- Tampa International Airport People Movers
