= Orlando International Airport =

Airport serving Orlando, Florida, United States

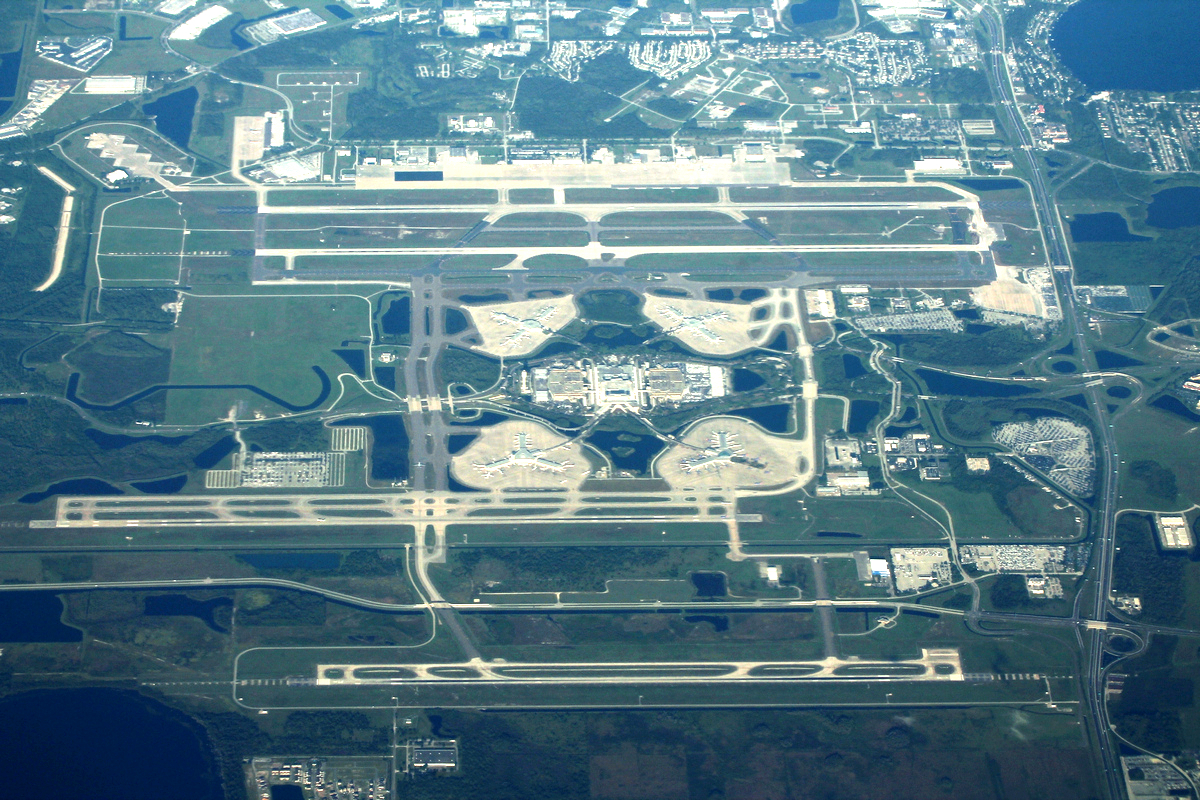
- Aerial view of Orlando International Airport
- IATA: MCO; ICAO: KMCO; FAA LID: MCO; WMO: 72205

Summary
- Airport type: Public
- Owner/Operator: Greater Orlando Aviation Authority
- Serves: Greater Orlando
- Location: Orlando, Florida, U.S.
- Opened: October 1961; 65 years ago
- Focus city for: JetBlue
- Operating base for: Breeze Airways; Frontier Airlines; Southwest Airlines
- Built: 1940; 86 years ago
- Elevation AMSL: 96 ft (29 m)
- Coordinates: 28°25′46″N 81°18′32″W
- Website: flymco.com

Maps
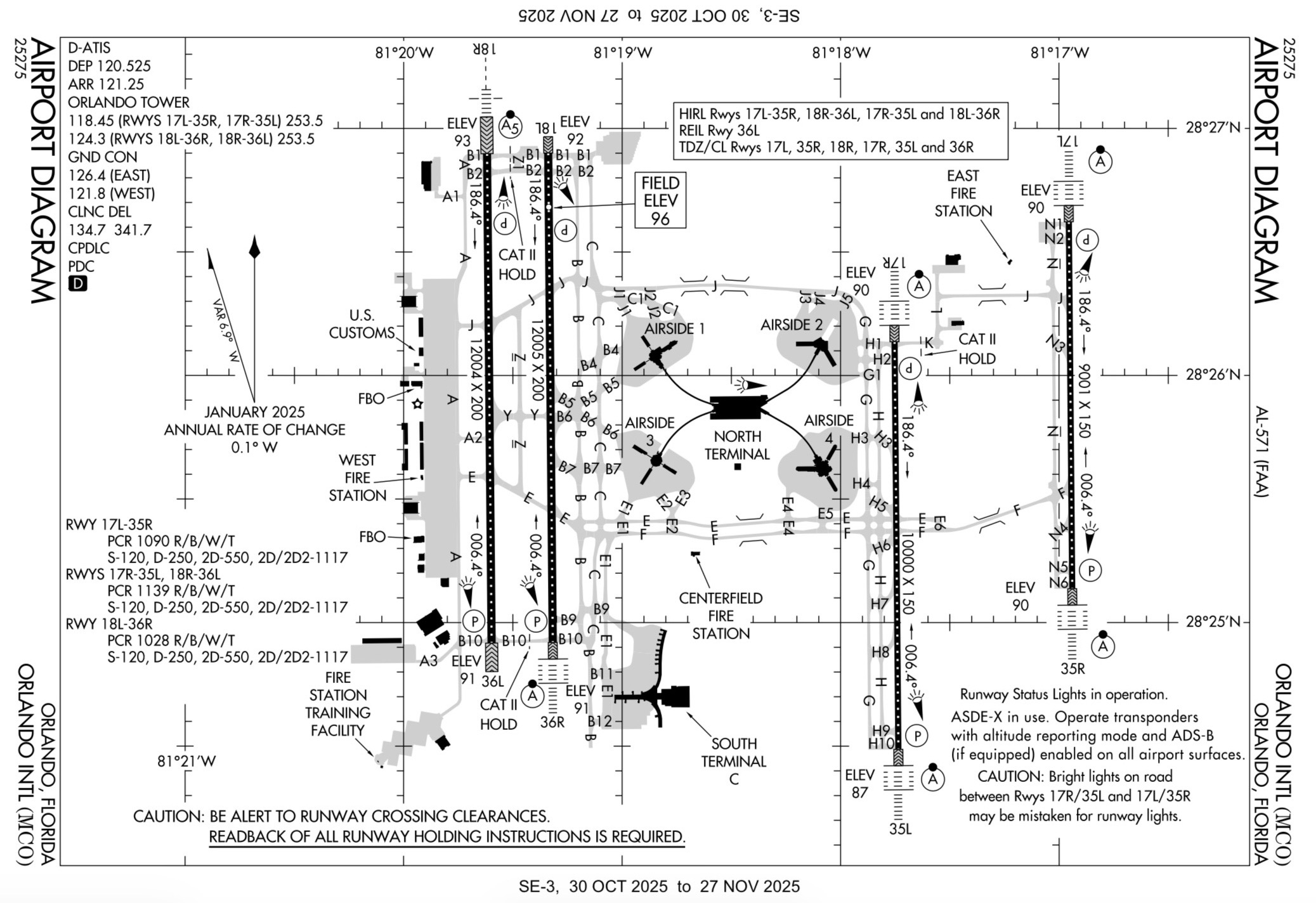
- FAA airport diagram
- Interactive map of Orlando International Airport

Runways
Direction	Length		Surface
Direction	ft	m	Surface
17L/35R	9,001	2,743	Concrete
17R/35L	10,000	3,048	Concrete
18L/36R	12,005	3,659	Asphalt concrete
18R/36L	12,004	3,659	Concrete

Statistics (2025)
- Aircraft operations: 386,904
- Total passengers: 57,675,573 ▲0.81%
- Airfreight (tons): 222,705
- Source: Aircraft operations: Federal Aviation Administration; Passengers: Airports Council International

Orlando International Airport (IATA: MCO, ICAO: KMCO, FAA LID: MCO) is the primary international airport serving Orlando, Florida, located 6 miles (9.7 km) southeast of Downtown. In 2025, the airport served 57,675,573 passengers, making it the busiest airport in the state and the seventh busiest airport in the United States. The airport code MCO comes from the airport's former name, McCoy Air Force Base, a Strategic Air Command installation, that was closed in 1975 as part of a general military drawdown following the end of the Vietnam War.

The airport serves as an operating base for Breeze Airways, Frontier Airlines, and Southwest Airlines as well as a focus city for JetBlue. Southwest is the airport's largest carrier by passengers carried. The airport is also a major international gateway for the Florida region, with over 1,000 daily flights on more than 40 airlines serving over 170 domestic and international destinations. At 11,605 acres (18.1 sq mi; 47.0 km^{2}), MCO is one of the largest commercial airports in terms of land area in the United States. In addition, the airport is home to a maintenance base for United Airlines. The airport was also a hub for Delta Air Lines until 2007.

== History ==
=== Military years ===
The airfield originated during World War II as a United States Army Air Forces facility. In 1942, the Army acquired land southeast of Orlando to develop an airfield for military aviation operations, including those of the Boeing B-17 Flying Fortress. Originally known as Orlando Army Air Field Number Two, the installation served as an auxiliary airfield to Orlando Army Air Base, now known as Orlando Executive Airport. It was renamed Pinecastle Army Airfield in 1943.

Following World War II, Pinecastle was used for early flight testing of the Bell X-1 experimental aircraft. On January 19, 1946, Bell test pilot Jack Woolams conducted the aircraft's first unpowered glide flight after being released from a Boeing B-29 Superfortress. Woolams completed ten glide flights before the aircraft was returned to Bell for installation of its rocket engine. The X-1 program subsequently continued at Muroc Army Airfield in California, now Edwards Air Force Base, where Chuck Yeager achieved the first supersonic flight on October 14, 1947.

After the war, the airfield was decommissioned, and most of its facilities were dismantled. The property was deeded back to the City of Orlando in 1948. In 1951, during the Korean War, the installation was reactivated as Pinecastle Air Force Base to serve as a training facility for Boeing B-47 Stratojet bombers. It became a combat facility under the Strategic Air Command (SAC) in 1954.

The 321st Bombardment Wing was activated at Pinecastle on December 15, 1953, and operated B-47 Stratojet bombers and Boeing KC-97 Stratofreighter aerial refueling aircraft. Colonel Michael Norman Wright McCoy assumed command of the wing in 1954.

On October 9, 1957, McCoy was killed when his B-47 Stratojet crashed north of Orlando during a flight demonstration. The crash also killed the other three occupants of the aircraft, including an officer of the British Royal Air Force. Pinecastle Air Force Base was renamed McCoy Air Force Base in May 1958 in honor of the colonel.

In the early 1960s, McCoy transitioned from medium bomber operations to heavy bomber operations. The introduction of the Boeing B-52 Stratofortress in 1961 resulted in the construction of two parallel runways approximately 12,000 feet (3,700 m) in length. On April 1, 1963, the 306th Bombardment Wing relocated from MacDill Air Force Base to McCoy, where it operated B-52 bombers and Boeing KC-135 Stratotanker aerial refueling aircraft.

McCoy also hosted the 966th Airborne Early Warning and Control Squadron, a unit of the Air Defense Command, from February 1962 to December 1969. The squadron conducted airborne radar surveillance using RC-121 and Lockheed EC-121 Warning Star aircraft.

During the Cuban Missile Crisis in October 1962, McCoy Air Force Base became a forward operating location for tactical fighter aircraft. As part of the United States military buildup in Florida, the Strategic Air Command dispersed bomber and tanker aircraft from McCoy and other Florida bases to make room for aircraft of the Tactical Air Command. The forces deployed to McCoy included Republic F-105 Thunderchief fighter-bombers of the 4th Tactical Fighter Wing and North American F-100 Super Sabre fighter-bombers of the 354th Tactical Fighter Wing.

McCoy also served as a base for Lockheed U-2 reconnaissance flights over Cuba. On October 27, 1962, Major Rudolf Anderson Jr. was killed when his U-2, which had departed McCoy on a reconnaissance mission, was shot down over Cuba by a Soviet SA-2 Guideline surface-to-air missile. Anderson was posthumously awarded the first Air Force Cross.

In 1973, the United States Department of Defense announced plans to close McCoy Air Force Base as part of a broader reduction and realignment of military installations. The closure plan called for the inactivation of the 306th Bombardment Wing and its B-52D-equipped 36th Bombardment Squadron, the reassignment of KC-135 aircraft to McConnell Air Force Base and Lockbourne Air Force Base, and the relocation of an EC-121 detachment of the 55th Airborne Early Warning and Control Squadron to Homestead Air Force Base.

The 306th Bombardment Wing was inactivated on July 1, 1974, ending its operations at McCoy. Following the closure of the military base in 1974, the City of Orlando received the deed to surplus airport property in 1975. Most of the former military installation subsequently became part of Orlando International Airport.

=== Civil-military years ===
The introduction of commercial jet aircraft in the late 1950s and early 1960s created a need for longer runways than those available at Orlando's existing commercial airport, now known as Orlando Executive Airport. The introduction of B-52 bombers at McCoy Air Force Base in 1961 led to the construction of two parallel runways approximately 12,000 feet (3,700 m) in length, making the installation suitable for commercial jet operations.

In 1962, the City of Orlando and the United States Air Force entered into a joint-use agreement that allocated approximately 960 acres (390 ha) for civilian aviation facilities. The Air Force permitted commercial aircraft to use Runway 18L/36R, and civilian terminal facilities were developed alongside the existing military installation. The civilian airport became known as the Orlando Jetport at McCoy.

The city subsequently acquired additional land for civilian aviation development and completed its first airport master plan in 1969, establishing the framework for the expansion of the commercial airport.

The 1971 opening of Magic Kingdom at Walt Disney World led to a significant increase in air travel as Orlando became a major tourist destination. For much of the 1970s, Shawnee Airlines would directly link MCO with Walt Disney World using de Havilland Canada DHC-6 Twin Otter commuter aircraft. These connecting flights flew from MCO to the Walt Disney World STOL Airport, a small, short-lived airfield near the Magic Kingdom's parking lot. Deregulation of the airline industry in 1978 also contributed to increases in air service to Orlando.

When McCoy AFB closed in 1975, part of the facility stayed under military control to support Naval Training Center Orlando and several tenant commands until NTC Orlando was closed in 1999 pursuant to a post-Cold War 1993 BRAC Commission decision.

There are only a few enclaves on the original McCoy AFB site that the military still uses such as the 164th Air Defense Artillery Brigade from the Florida Army National Guard in the former McCoy AFB Officers Club complex, an Army Reserve intelligence unit in the former SAC Alert Facility, the 1st Lieutenant David R. Wilson Armed Forces Reserve Center supporting multiple units of the Army Reserve, Navy Reserve and Marine Corps Reserve that was constructed in 2002, and a large Navy Exchange for active, reserve and retired military personnel and their dependents.

=== Civil years ===
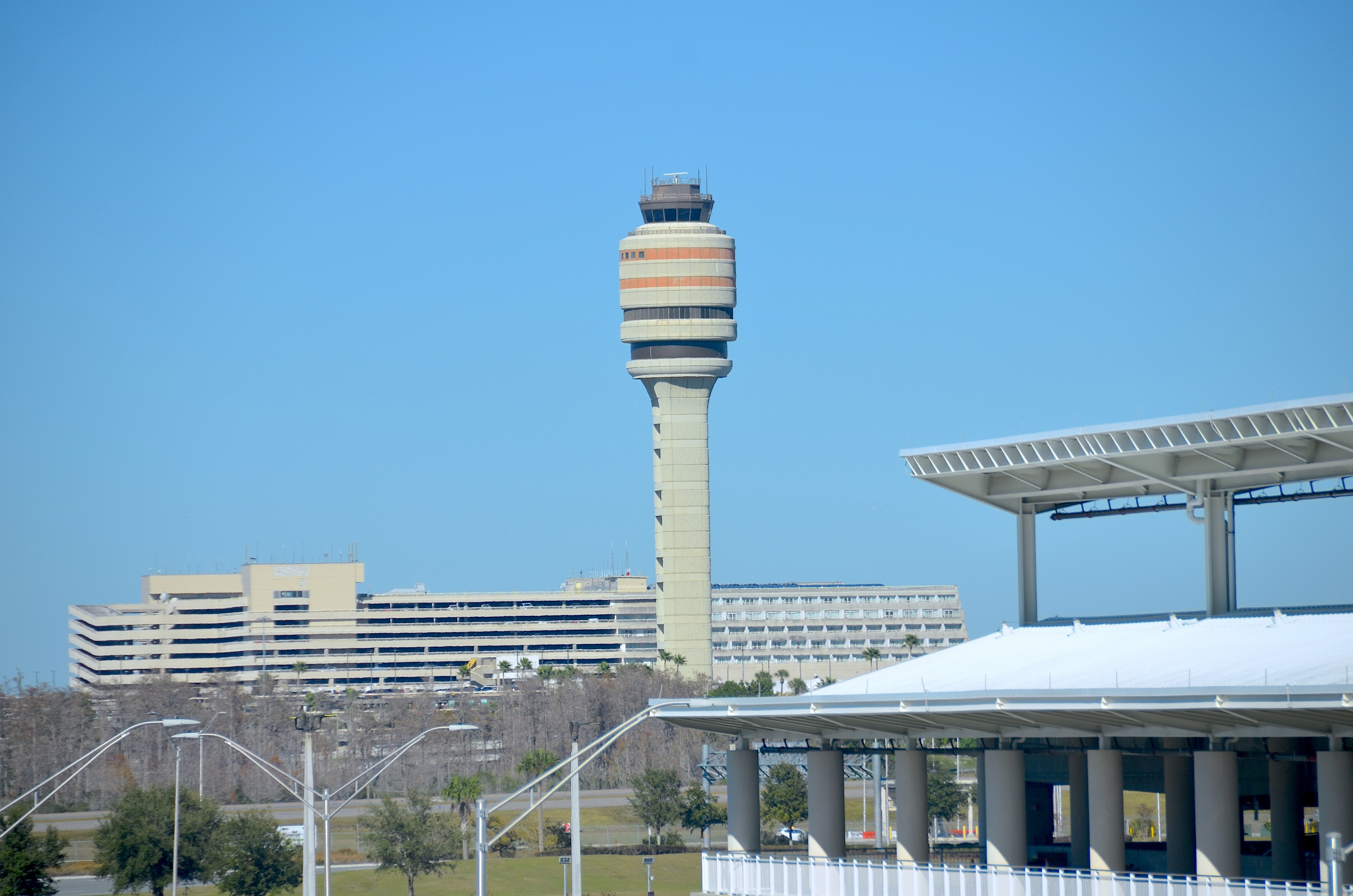
View from Terminal C towards North Terminal Complex and Air traffic control tower

In 1975, following the closure of McCoy Air Force Base, the City of Orlando received the airport property from the federal government. The Greater Orlando Aviation Authority (GOAA) was established by an act of the Florida Legislature that year to manage and develop the city's airports, including Orlando Executive Airport. In 1976, the airport received international status and was renamed Orlando International Airport, retaining the airport code MCO derived from its former military designation.

The airport became a U.S. Customs Service Foreign Trade Zone (FTZ) in 1978, said zone being designated as FTZ #42. In 1979, the facility was also designated as a large hub airport by the FAA based on flight operations and passenger traffic.

In 1981, the airport opened a new midfield terminal complex incorporating Airsides 1 and 3. An international arrivals facility opened at Airside 1 in 1984. The airport's third parallel runway, now designated 17R/35L, opened in 1989, followed by the opening of Airside 4 in 1990. Airside 2 opened in September 2000, completing the four-airside configuration of the North Terminal Complex. A new 345-foot (105 m) air traffic control tower opened in 2002, and a fourth parallel runway, 17L/35R, opened in December 2003.

In 1978, the airport handled nearly 5.2 million passengers. By 2018, that number had risen to 47.7 million. Presently, it is the fifth-largest airport in the United States by land area after Denver International Airport, Dallas/Fort Worth International Airport, Southwest Florida International Airport, and Washington Dulles International Airport. At 11,605 acres, MCO has a larger footprint than John F. Kennedy International Airport, Miami International Airport, and Heathrow Airport combined. MCO has North America's fourth tallest control tower at 345 feet, replacing two earlier Air Force and FAA control towers.

Orlando was a designated Space Shuttle emergency landing site. The west-side runways, Runway 18L/36R and Runway 18R/36L, were designed for B-52 Stratofortress bombers, and due to their proximity to NASA's John F. Kennedy Space Center, were an obvious choice for an emergency landing should an emergency return to launch site (RTLS) attempt to land at KSC have fallen short. The runway was also an emergency divert site for NASA's Boeing 747 Shuttle Transport Aircraft when relocating orbiters from either west coast modification work or divert recoveries at Edwards AFB, California or the White Sands Missile Range, New Mexico.

Eastern Air Lines used Orlando as a focus city during the 1970s and early 1980s, and became "the official airline of Walt Disney World." Following Eastern's demise, Delta Air Lines assumed this role.

Delta Air Lines began operating a hub at MCO in 1987. Airside 4, which opened in 1990, was primarily designed for Delta's hub operation and it included a ramp tower, an international arrivals facility, and a wing for regional aircraft under the people mover guideway. Delta would later pull much of its large aircraft from its hub operations and focused its service there on regional flights via their Delta Connection affiliate Comair. Comair operated intra-Florida flights as well as flights to other southeastern cities and to the Caribbean. In 2002, Chautauqua Airlines replaced Comair as the primary Delta Connection carrier at MCO. Delta closed the Orlando hub entirely in 2007.

Orlando-based AirTran Airways also operated a hub at MCO from 1993 until the airline's merger with Southwest Airlines in 2014. After Delta closed their hub in 2007, AirTran relocated their hub to Airside 4, using some of Delta's former gates which allowed them to double their capacity. AirTran merged with Southwest Airlines in 2014, which is today the busiest carrier at MCO.

Saudi Arabian Airlines began service to Orlando in 1994. Its seasonal flights to Jeddah proved popular among Saudi tourists. Bookings declined after the September 11 attacks, however, so Saudi Arabian terminated the link.

On February 22, 2005, the airport became the first airport in Florida to accept E-Pass and SunPass toll transponders as a form of payment for parking. The system allows drivers to enter and exit a parking garage without pulling a ticket or stopping to pay the parking fee. The two toll roads that serve the airport, SR 528 (Beachline Expressway) and SR 417 (Central Florida GreeneWay), use these systems for automatic toll collection.

The original terminal building, a converted hangar, was described as inadequate for the task at hand even when it was first opened as Orlando Jetport. After its closure in 1981, it passed through several tenants, the last of which was UPS. It was demolished in May 2006.

On February 1, 2010, Allegiant Air began operations at the airport. The company moved one half of its schedule from its operating base at nearby SFB to MCO to test revenue at the higher cost airport. After evaluating the routes out of Orlando, the carrier decided to consolidate and return its Orlando area operations to SFB citing an inability to achieve a fare premium at MCO as anticipated, passenger preference for SFB, higher costs at MCO than expected and a more efficient operating environment at SFB. Allegiant Air resumed operating some flights at MCO in 2024.

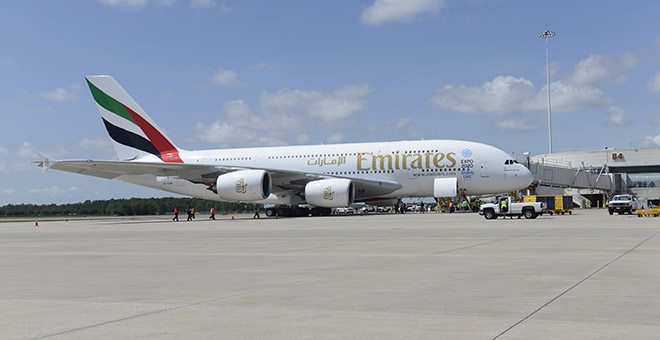
Emirates operated its very first flight to the airport using an Airbus A380. This flight is regularly operated using the Boeing 777.

In March 2015, Emirates announced that they would begin daily service to the airport from Dubai International Airport beginning September 1, 2015. The airport had tried to attract Emirates for five years before the service was announced. Orlando International was the first airport in Florida served by Emirates. The airline expects three major markets for the flights: leisure and corporate travelers along with locals of Asian heritage traveling to Asia, which is well-served by the airline. Greater Orlando Aviation Association Chair Frank Kruppenbacher called the new service "without question the biggest, most significant move forward for our airport" and estimates that the local economic impact of the new service will be up to $100 million annually. The inaugural flight was made with an Airbus A380. Regularly scheduled flights operate with Boeing 777-300ERs. Gate 90 was updated in the summer of 2018 with 3 jetways to be able to properly handle the A380, 3 years after the airplane first arrived at Orlando, docking at Gate 84.

In May 2016, the airport launched its own radio station, FlyMCO 105.1 HD2, a subchannel of WOMX-FM. FlyMCO 105.1 HD2 provides access to airport information, local weather, and music.

In 2017, the airport reached 44.6 million passengers, surpassing Miami International Airport to become the busiest airport in the state of Florida.

The Orlando International Airport Intermodal Terminal, which was partially funded by the Florida Department of Transportation, opened in November 2017 and is connected to the Terminal A/B complex by Terminal Link, an automated people mover. The $684 million station included a new 2,500 space parking garage (which would also be the parking garage for Terminal C), and the Orlando station for the Brightline higher speed regional rail service to South Florida which began service in 2023. The station reused some of the plans of the Orlando Airport station of the now defunct Florida High Speed Rail project.

In May 2015, the Board of the Greater Orlando Aviation Authority voted unanimously to approve construction of the $1.8 billion South Terminal Complex. Construction of the first phase of the South Terminal Complex, Terminal C, began in 2017. Terminal C opened on September 19, 2022, with 20 gates. Terminal C is connected to the Orlando International Airport Intermodal Terminal, which provides a connection to Terminals A/B via the Terminal Link people mover.

On May 2, 2026, Spirit Airlines, an operating base at Orlando International Airport, ceased all operations.

=== Future ===
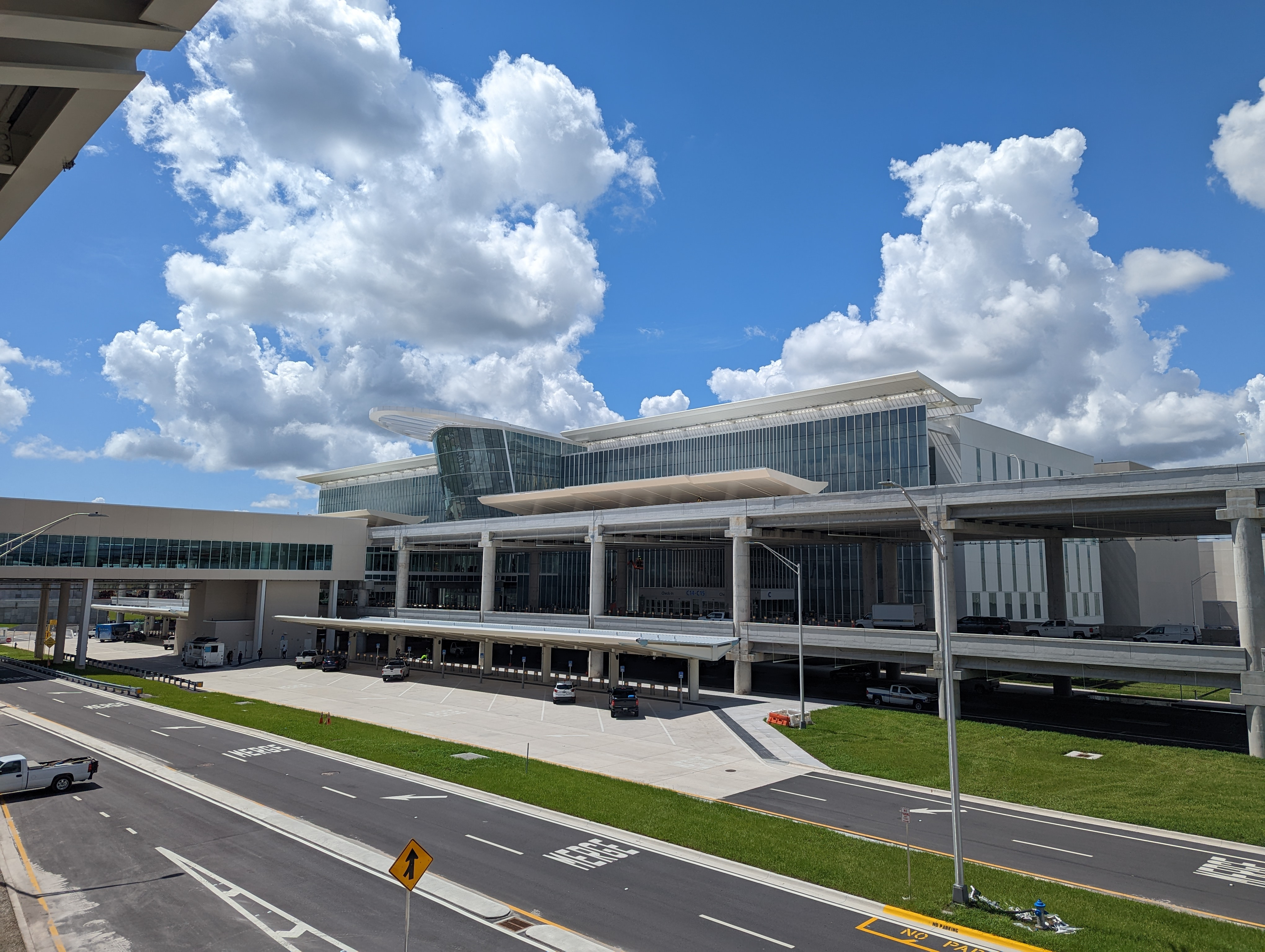
Terminal C on its opening day

There are plans to add an additional terminal, Terminal D, to the South Terminal Complex east of the Intermodal Terminal when the airport reaches 70 million passengers annually. The final estimated capacity of the airport is set at 100 million passengers annually when completed. When fully complete, the South Terminal Complex will have 120 gates in both terminals C and D.

Currently, there are future plans in development to renovate the North Terminal in the Orlando International Airport, where Terminals A & B are located.

Additionally, other projects are also in development alongside the renovation of the North Terminal. A new CONRAC is planned in the future, upgrades to the baggage handling systems, and other future upgrades are planned.

The Orlando International Airport Intermodal Terminal was built to accommodate an extension of the SunRail commuter rail service. The route to the current SunRail line would travel along an Orlando Utilities Commission rail spur, before either branching off to the intermodal station, or have an intermediate transfer point on to light rail to complete the journey to this station. Additionally, a new vertiport is planned in the future into its multimodal hub.

Multiple options are being considered for a link to International Drive, either with elevated maglev train system, connecting the airport to the Orange County Convention Center, the Florida Mall, and the Sand Lake Road SunRail station, or a light rail link running along a similar route as the maglev alternative between the airport and International Drive.

== Facilities ==
=== Terminals A & B ===
Terminals A and B are located on the north side of the airfield. The two terminals are located in the same building with Terminal A being the north side of the building and Terminal B on the south side. A food court and two atriums are located in the middle of the building between the two terminals. Terminals A & B collectively contain four airside concourses that are accessed through elevated people mover systems known as Gate Links:

- Airside 1 contains 29 gates (Gates 1–29)
- Airside 2 contains 30 gates (Gates 100–129)
- Airside 3 contains 30 gates (Gates 30–59)
- Airside 4 contains 30 gates (Gates 70–99) (Note: Gates 60-69 are currently out of service. They were ground-level gates located on a wing under the people mover guideway and were used when Delta had a hub.)

Airsides 1 and 3 are located on the west side of the terminal building with a shared security checkpoint in the west atrium. Airsides 2 and 4 are located on the east side with a shared security checkpoint in the east atrium.

The west half of Terminals A and B, along with gates 1-59 (present-day Airsides 1 and 3) opened in 1981. The terminal was expanded with the east half in the late 1980s with present-day Airside 4 opening in 1990. Airside 2 opened in 2000.

Airlines operating from Terminal A are Avelo, Frontier Airlines, and Southwest Airlines, meaning their check-in counters are located in this terminal, however some flights may arrive at terminal B.

Airlines that operate from Terminal B include Air Canada, Air Canada Rouge, Alaska Airlines, Allegiant, American Airlines, Bahamasair, BermudAir, Breeze, Delta, Flair Airlines, LATAM Airlines, Sun Country Airlines, United Airlines, Viva, Volaris, Volaris Costa Rica and WestJet.

=== Terminal C ===
Terminal C, also known as the South Terminal Complex, contains gates 230–254. Terminal C accommodates all other international flights by non-US airlines and as well all JetBlue flights. The terminal is connected to the Intermodal Terminal by an elevated enclosed walkway and a shared parking garage. Terminal C is connected to the Terminal A & B complex by Terminal Link, an automated people mover at the Intermodal Terminal.

=== Intermodal Terminal ===
The Intermodal Terminal is connected to Terminal C. It serves as the Orlando station for Brightline, a higher speed regional rail service to South Florida. The Intermodal Terminal opened in November 2017 with Brightline service commencing in September 2023. The Intermodal Terminal and Terminal C are connected to the Terminal A & B complex by Terminal Link, an automated people mover.

=== Hotel ===
The airport features an on-site Hyatt Regency hotel within the main terminal structure. The hotel is located on the east side of the Terminal A/B complex with a fourth floor lobby level and guest rooms beginning on level five and above. The hotel features an expansive lobby area for guests awaiting flights, convention space, several bars, and two restaurants including a signature restaurant on the top level of the terminal building overlooking the airport facility and runways below.

=== Interfaith chapel ===
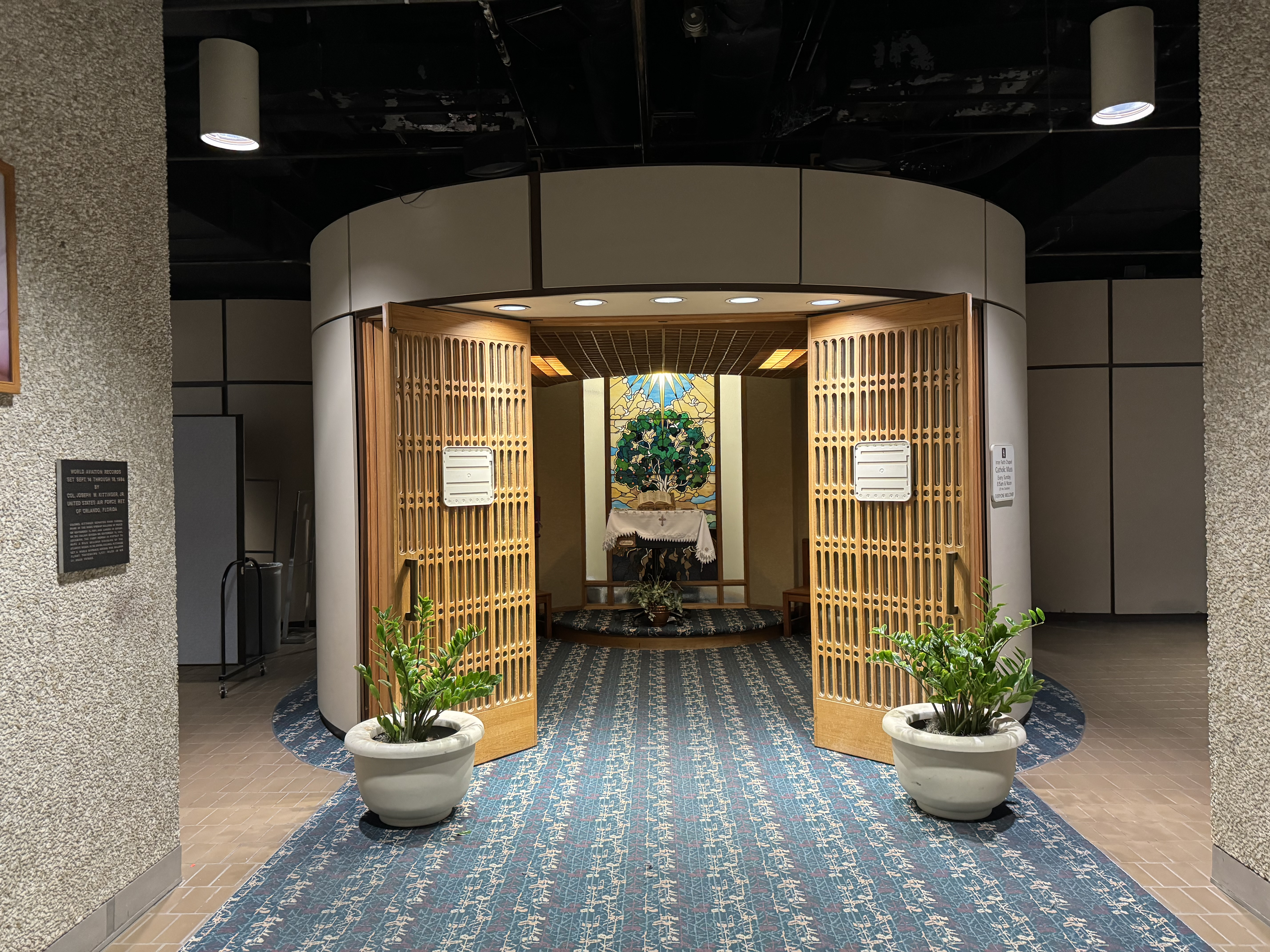
Orlando International Airport Chapel

In 1981, an interfaith chapel was constructed behind the security for Gates 1-59. Prior to 2019, the chapel held religious services, but this moved to a nearby hotel because of an uptick in religious violence.

== Airlines and destinations ==
=== Passenger ===
Airlines	Destinations
Aer Lingus	Dublin
Aeroméxico	Mexico City–Benito Juárez; Seasonal: Guadalajara, Monterrey
Air Canada	Toronto–Pearson
Air Canada Rouge	Montréal–Trudeau, Toronto–Pearson; Seasonal: Halifax, Ottawa, Québec City
Air France	Paris–Charles de Gaulle
Alaska Airlines	Portland (OR), San Diego, Seattle/Tacoma
Allegiant Air	Allentown, Appleton, Asheville, Cincinnati (begins February 12, 2027), Flint (begins February 10, 2027), Knoxville
American Airlines	Charlotte, Chicago–O'Hare, Dallas/Fort Worth, Los Angeles, Miami, New York–LaGuardia, Philadelphia, Phoenix–Sky Harbor, Washington–National; Seasonal: Boston
Avelo Airlines	Charlotte/Concord, Dallas/McKinney, New Haven, Wilmington (DE)
Avianca	Bogotá; Seasonal: Medellín–JMC
Avianca El Salvador	Seasonal: San Salvador
Azul Brazilian Airlines	Belo Horizonte–Confins, Campinas, Recife
Bahamasair	Nassau; Seasonal: Freeport
Breeze Airways	Akron/Canton, Atlantic City, Bangor, Brownsville/South Padre Island, Burlington (VT), Charleston (SC), Charleston (WV), Erie, Evansville, Greensboro, Gulfport/Biloxi, Huntsville, Key West, Lancaster (PA), Lansing, Latrobe/Pittsburgh (begins May 26, 2027), Lincoln, Myrtle Beach, New Bern, Newburgh, New Haven, New Orleans, Norfolk, Pensacola, Portland (ME), Portsmouth, Providence, Provo, Raleigh/Durham, Salisbury, South Bend, Springfield (IL), Tri-Cities (TN), Wilkes-Barre/Scranton, Wilmington (NC); Seasonal: Fayetteville/Bentonville, Greenville/Spartanburg, Hartford, Madison, Ogdensburg, Orange County
British Airways	London–Gatwick
Caribbean Airlines	Port of Spain
Copa Airlines	Panama City–Tocumen
Delta Air Lines	Atlanta, Austin, Boston, Cincinnati, Detroit, Los Angeles, Minneapolis/St. Paul, New York–JFK, New York–LaGuardia, Raleigh/Durham, Salt Lake City, Seattle/Tacoma, Washington–National; Seasonal: Amsterdam
Delta Connection	Seasonal: Columbus–Glenn, Grand Rapids, Indianapolis, Kansas City, Louisville, Nashville, Pittsburgh
Discover Airlines	Frankfurt; Seasonal: Munich
Emirates	Dubai–International
Flair Airlines	Seasonal: Toronto–Pearson
Frontier Airlines	Aguadilla, Atlanta, Austin, Baltimore, Bogotá (begins December 14, 2026), Buffalo, Cancún, Cartagena (begins December 19, 2026), Cedar Rapids/Iowa City, Charlotte, Chicago–Midway, Chicago–O'Hare, Cincinnati, Cleveland, Columbus–Glenn, Dallas/Fort Worth, Denver, Detroit, Grand Rapids, Hartford, Houston–Intercontinental, Indianapolis, Las Vegas, Long Island/Islip, Los Angeles, Medellín–JMC (begins December 10, 2026), Milwaukee, Montego Bay, Nashville, New York–LaGuardia, Newark, Norfolk, Oklahoma City, Pensacola, Philadelphia, Phoenix–Sky Harbor, Ponce, Raleigh/Durham, Richmond, St. Louis, Salt Lake City, San Antonio, San Juan, Trenton, Washington–Dulles; Seasonal: Des Moines, Fargo, Guatemala City, Minneapolis/St. Paul, Omaha, Pittsburgh, San José (CR), San Pedro Sula, San Salvador
Gol Linhas Aéreas	Brasília (ends January 31, 2027), Fortaleza (ends January 30, 2027)
Iberia	Madrid
Icelandair	Reykjavík–Keflavík
JetBlue	Aguadilla, Albany, Boston, Buffalo, Cancún, Fort Lauderdale, Hartford, Las Vegas, Long Island/Islip, Montego Bay, Nassau, New York–JFK, New York–LaGuardia, Newark, Ponce, Providence, Punta Cana, Richmond, Rochester (NY), San Juan, Santiago de los Caballeros, Santo Domingo–Las Américas, Syracuse, Washington–National, White Plains, Worcester; Seasonal: Portland (ME)
LATAM Brasil	São Paulo–Guarulhos
LATAM Chile	Seasonal: Santiago de Chile
LATAM Colombia	Bogotá
LATAM Perú	Lima
Norse Atlantic Airways	London–Gatwick
Porter Airlines	Ottawa, Toronto–Pearson; Seasonal: Halifax, Hamilton (ON), London (ON)
Southwest Airlines	Albany, Aruba, Atlanta, Austin, Baltimore, Birmingham (AL), Buffalo, Cancún, Chicago–Midway, Cincinnati, Cleveland, Columbus–Glenn, Dallas–Love, Denver, Fort Lauderdale, Fort Myers, Grand Cayman, Grand Rapids, Hartford, Houston–Hobby, Indianapolis, Kansas City, Knoxville, Las Vegas, Long Island/Islip, Los Angeles, Louisville, Manchester (NH), Memphis, Miami, Milwaukee, Montego Bay, Nashville, Nassau, New Orleans, New York–LaGuardia (begins March 11, 2027), Norfolk, Oklahoma City, Omaha, Pensacola (begins March 11, 2027), Philadelphia, Phoenix–Sky Harbor, Pittsburgh, Providence, Providenciales, Punta Cana, Raleigh/Durham, Richmond, Rochester (NY), Sacramento, St. Louis, St. Maarten, St. Thomas, San Antonio, San Diego, San José (CR), San Juan, Sarasota, Washington–National, West Palm Beach; Seasonal: Albuquerque, Boston, Detroit, El Paso, Jackson (MS), Minneapolis/St. Paul, Portland (ME), Salt Lake City, Tulsa, Wichita
Sun Country Airlines	Minneapolis/St. Paul; Seasonal: Milwaukee
TAP Air Portugal	Lisbon
United Airlines	Chicago–O'Hare, Cleveland, Denver, Houston–Intercontinental, Los Angeles, Newark, San Francisco, Washington–Dulles
Virgin Atlantic	London–Heathrow, Manchester (UK); Seasonal: Edinburgh
Viva	Mérida, Monterrey
Volaris	Guadalajara, Mexico City–Benito Juárez, Querétaro
Volaris Costa Rica	San José (CR)
WestJet	Calgary, Toronto–Pearson, Seasonal: Edmonton, Winnipeg
Zipair Tokyo	Charter: Tokyo–Narita

=== Cargo ===
Airlines	Destinations
FedEx Feeder	Tallahassee

== Statistics ==
=== Top destinations ===
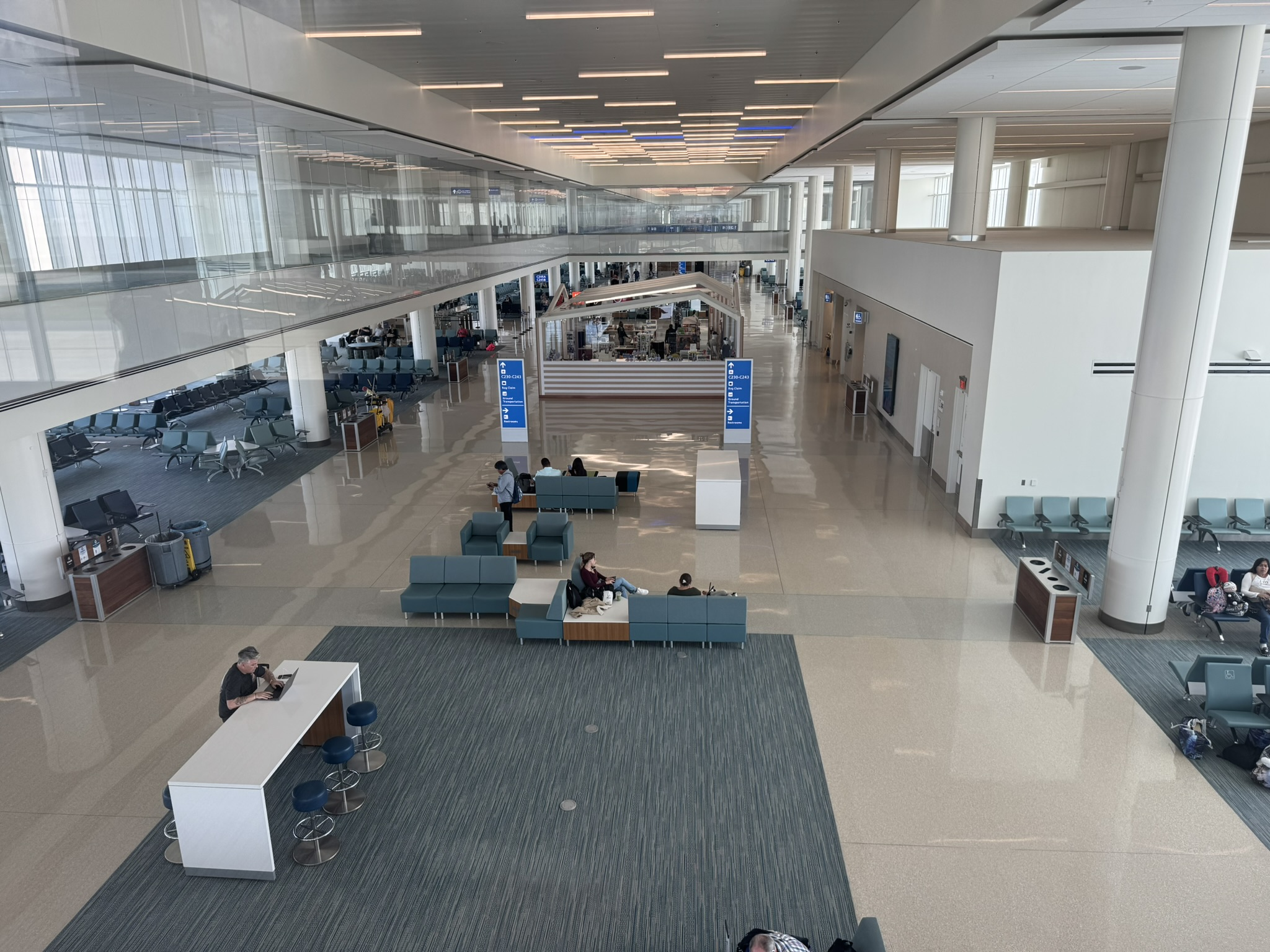
Main corridor of Terminal C

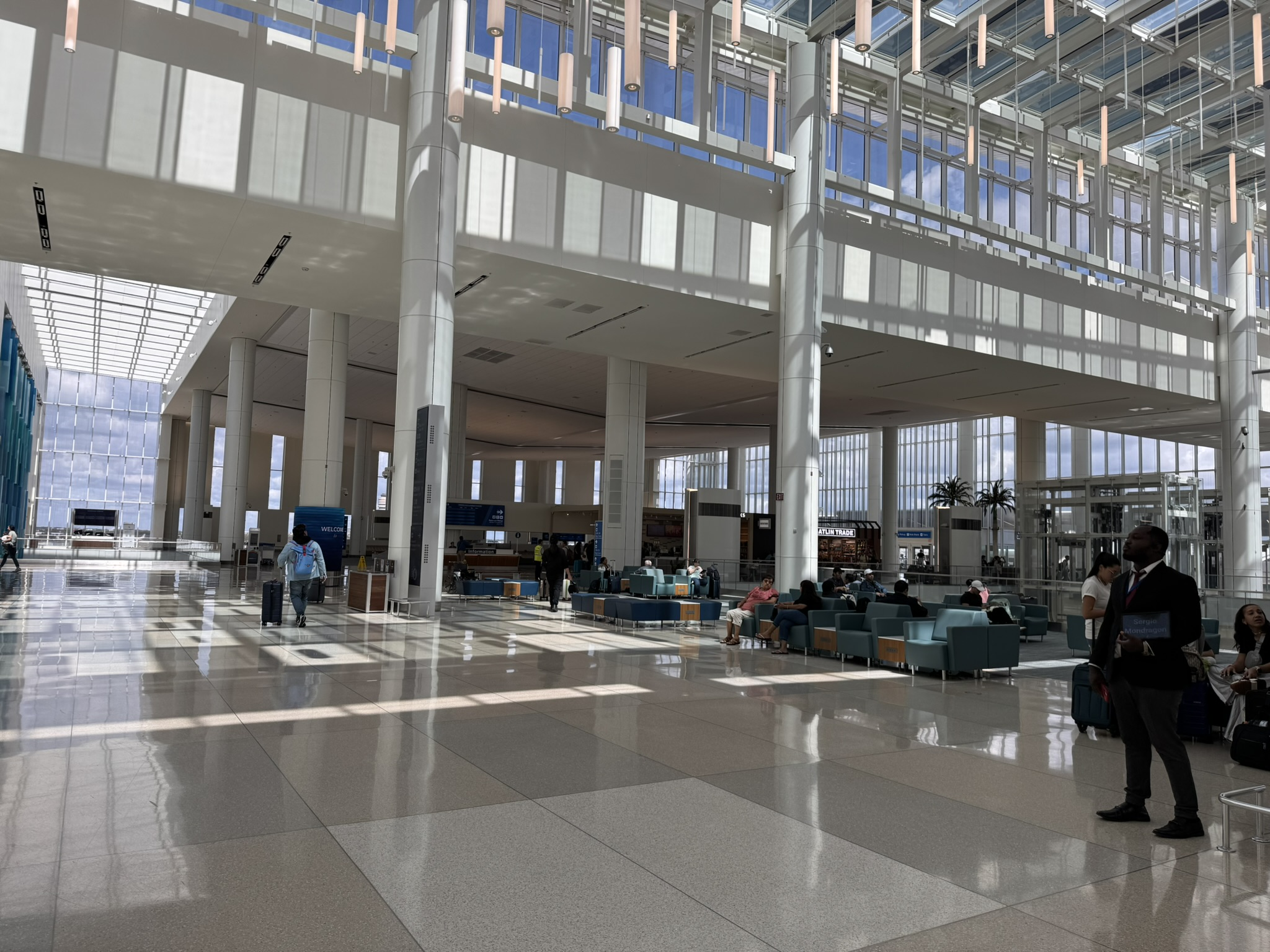
Arrivals at Terminal C

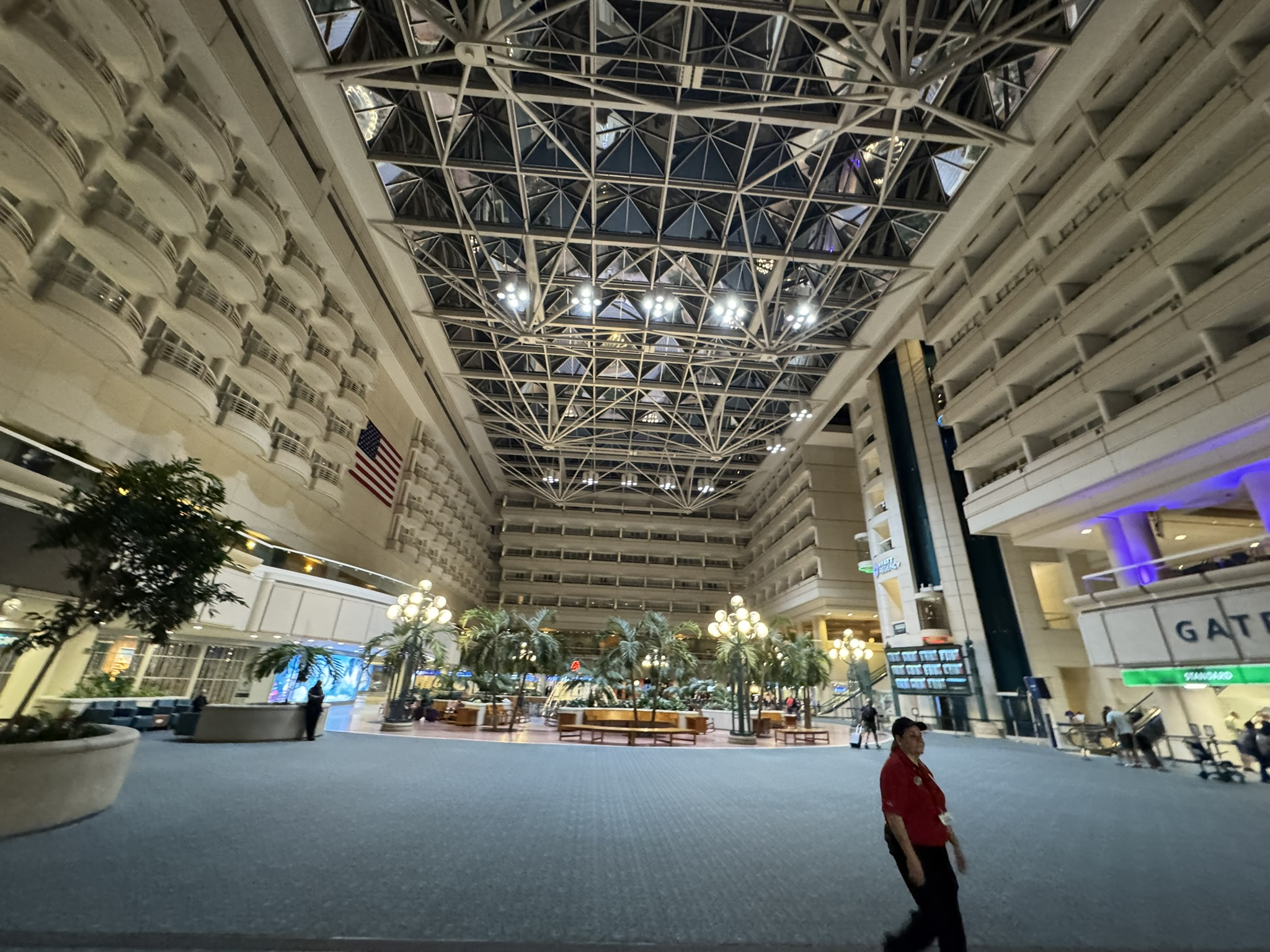
Main atrium of the airport

Busiest domestic routes from MCO (September 2025 – August 2026)
Rank	Airport	Passengers	Airlines
1	Atlanta, Georgia	1,342,496	Delta, Frontier, Southwest, Spirit
2	San Juan, Puerto Rico	962,766	Frontier, JetBlue, Southwest, Spirit
3	Chicago–O'Hare, Illinois	948,383	American, Frontier, Southwest, Spirit, United
4	Newark, New Jersey	945,712	Frontier, JetBlue, Spirit, United
5	Philadelphia, Pennsylvania	851,927	American, Frontier, Southwest, Spirit
6	Dallas/Fort Worth, Texas	801,843	American, Frontier, Spirit
7	New York–LaGuardia, New York	789,446	American, Delta, Frontier, JetBlue, Spirit
8	Denver, Colorado	757,460	Frontier, Southwest, United
9	Charlotte, North Carolina	714,713	American, Frontier, Spirit
10	New York–JFK, New York	708,566	Delta, Frontier, JetBlue

Busiest international routes from Orlando (September 2025 – August 2026)
Rank	City	Passengers	Top carriers
1	Toronto, Canada	682,884	Air Canada, Air Canada Rouge, Flair Airlines, Porter Airlines, WestJet
2	Panama City–Tocumen, Panama	623,912	Copa Airlines
3	Bogotá, Colombia	480,257	Aerovias de Intergracian Regional, Avianca, Spirit Airlines
4	London–Gatwick, United Kingdom	452,368	British Airways, Norse Atlantic UK
5	Mexico City, Mexico	349,427	Aeroméxico, Volaris
6	San José, Costa Rica	349,175	JetBlue, Southwest, Spirit, Vuela Aviacion
7	London–Heathrow, United Kingdom	343,272	Virgin Atlantic
8	São Paulo, Brazil	325,906	LATAM Brasil
9	Manchester, United Kingdom	318,865	Aer Lingus, Virgin Atlantic
10	Montréal, Canada	303,034	Air Canada Rouge, Air Transat

=== Airline market share ===
Top airlines at MCO (September 2025 – August 2026)
Rank	Airline	Passengers	Percent of market share
1	Southwest Airlines	13,909,318	24.9%
2	Delta Air Lines	7,207,768	12.9%
3	Frontier Airlines	6,582,443	11.8%
4	American Airlines	5,768,126	10.3%
5	JetBlue Airways	5,661,696	10.1%
	Other	16,800,000	30.0%

=== Annual traffic ===
Annual traffic at MCO 1971–present
Year	Passengers	Year	Passengers	Year	Passengers	Year	Passengers
1971	1,287,540	1986	12,495,336	2001	28,253,248	2016	41,923,399
1972	2,380,564	1987	14,901,251	2002	26,653,672	2017	44,611,265
1973	2,828,931	1988	16,497,262	2003	27,319,223	2018	47,696,627
1974	3,079,009	1989	17,232,351	2004	31,143,388	2019	50,613,072
1975	3,334,011	1990	18,397,830	2005	34,128,048	2020	21,617,803
1976	3,678,346	1991	18,411,945	2006	34,640,451	2021	40,351,068
1977	4,154,781	1992	21,147,764	2007	36,480,416	2022	50,178,499
1978	5,182,264	1993	21,465,983	2008	35,660,742	2023	57,735,720
1979	6,530,937	1994	22,392,412	2009	33,693,649	2024	57,211,628
1980	6,531,748	1995	22,462,732	2010	34,877,899	2025	57,675,573
1981	6,072,145	1996	25,587,773	2011	35,356,991	2026	
1982	6,920,303	1997	27,304,986	2012	35,214,430	2027	
1983	8,030,350	1998	27,795,131	2013	34,973,645	2028	
1984	8,726,645	1999	29,201,165	2014	35,714,091	2029	
1985	10,034,065	2000	30,823,509	2015	38,727,749	2030	

With available data beginning in 1971 for MCO to the end of 2025, 1,377,351,095 passengers (enplaned+deplaned) have passed through Orlando Int'l Airport, average of 25,042,747 passengers annually.

== Accidents and incidents ==
- On August 14, 2004, Hurricane Charley struck Orlando International Airport in the early morning which resulted in the roofs being torn off of three terminals and two giant glass panels shattering in the main terminal.
- On October 22, 2021, an Embraer Phenom 100 operated by Scout About LLC experienced a runway excursion accident upon landing at MCO. The pilot's inadvertent application of the right brake during the landing roll caused a loss of directional control and a subsequent runway excursion. There were no injuries among the 4 occupants on board but the aircraft was substantially damaged and written off.
- On May 7, 2026, a Delta Air Lines employee was killed after a vehicle struck a jet bridge next to a Delta aircraft with passengers inside. After the incident, passengers on Delta Air Lines Flight 2593 were escorted off of the aircraft.

== See also ==
- B-52 Memorial Park
- Florida World War II Army Airfields
- Innovation Way
- List of busiest airports by passenger traffic
- List of tallest air traffic control towers in the United States
- Orlando International Airport Peoplemovers
