= 2015 in rail transport =

This article lists events related to rail transport that occurred in 2015.

== Events ==
=== January ===
- January 2 – Reopening of Sri Lanka's Northern Line all the way to its terminus at Kankesanthurai.
- (United States) January 6 – Groundbreaking of the California High-Speed Rail system, indicating sustained construction activity.
- (Canada) January 13 - A CP Rail freight train, rerouted over the Stoney Creek Bridge in eastern British Columbia, proves unable to traverse the more challenging route, and six cars derail over the side of the bridge.

=== February ===
- (United States) February 3 – The Valhalla train crash, in which a train on Metro-North Railroad's Harlem Line strikes a vehicle at a level crossing in Valhalla, New York, killing six people and injuring 15.
- (Australia) February 8 – Opening of the South West Rail Link in Sydney.
- (Angola) February 14 – Rebuilt Benguela railway reopened throughout.
- February 24
  - (United States) – A Metrolink train on the Ventura County Line strikes a pickup truck at a level crossing in Oxnard, California, injuring 30.
  - – The first successful 16,156-mile round trip is completed on the world's longest railway line, the Yixin'ou cargo line, which connects Yiwu, China to Madrid, Spain.

=== March ===
- (United Kingdom) March 1 – Virgin Trains East Coast takes over InterCity East Coast franchise from East Coast
- (United Kingdom) March 7 – The Cathedrals Express return charter train from Bristol Temple Meads to Southend East, operated by West Coast Railways, overruns a signal passed at danger at Wootton Bassett Junction on the Great Western Main Line where it has a near miss with a First Great Western service from Swansea to London Paddington.
- March 14
  - (Japan) – The Hokuriku Shinkansen high-speed route opens from Nagano to Kanazawa, with the corresponding withdrawal of the 160 km/h express service on the Hokuhoku Line.
  - (Japan) – The Ueno–Tokyo Line route opens between Ueno and Tokyo Station.
- March 21 – 2015 Uttar Pradesh train accident: The Indian Railways Janata Express heading towards Varanasi overshoots a signal and derails near Bachhrawan in Uttar Pradesh, northern India, resulting in at least fifty-eight deaths and 150 injuries.
- (South Korea) March 28 – Line 9 of the Seoul Metro is extended from Sinnonhyeon to Sports Complex.

=== April ===
- (United Kingdom) April 1 – Abellio ScotRail takes over the ScotRail franchise from First ScotRail, while the Caledonian Sleeper service is taken over by Serco
- (United Kingdom) April 3 – Network Rail suspends West Coast Railways' train operating license following the SPAD incident at Wootton Bassett Junction on March 7.
- (United States) April 5 – Reopening of Tri-Rail's Miami Intermodal Center in Miami.

=== June ===
- (Malaysia) June 2 – Opening of BRT Sunway Line operated by RapidKL in Subang Jaya.
- (Canada) June 6 – Opening of the Union Pearson Express, an airport rail link in Toronto.
- (India) June 17 – A massive fire broke out at the RRI cabin at Itarsi Junction, disrupting and paralyzing thousands of train services for several weeks.
- (France) June 27 – SNCF TGV La Poste commits the last ride, making all high-speed freight services ended after more than 30 years operating.

=== July ===
- July 1 – Opening of the Ring Rail Line in Vantaa, Finland.

=== August ===
- (United States) August 22 – Phoenix Valley Metro Rail extends from Sycamore/Main Street to Mesa Drive/Main Street via the Central Mesa Extension.

=== September ===
- (United Kingdom) September 6 – Opening of the Borders Railway along the old Waverley Route.
- (Malaysia) September 11 – Opening of KTM Komuter Northern Sector in Penang, Kedah, Perlis and Northern Perak.
- September 12 – Opening of the MAX Orange Line in Portland, Oregon, United States.
- (United States) September 13 – New York City Subway 34th Street–Hudson Yards opens to public, after a series of delays.
- (Israel) September 17 – Opening of the Ashkelon–Beersheba railway.
- September 20 – Opening of one line of the Addis Ababa Light Rail in capital-city of Ethiopia: the first light-rail system to be built in sub-saharan Africa.
- (China) September 26 – Ningbo Rail Transit Line 2 opens connecting Lishe International Airport Station to Qingshuipu Station.

=== October ===
- (Estonia) (Latvia) (Lithuania) (Poland) October 16 – Completion of the first phase of Rail Baltica connecting Tallinn, Riga, Kaunas and Warsaw.
- (Malaysia) October 31 - The Sri Petaling Line LRT expands from Sri Petaling to Kinrara, the line's first expansion since 1998.

=== November ===
- (France) November 14 – Eckwersheim derailment: A TGV train derails in Alsace while performing commissioning trials on a section of the LGV Est high-speed rail line killing 11.
- November 17 – Aab-e-Gum derailment: The Jaffar Express passenger train traveling from Quetta to Rawalpindi, Pakistan, derails killing 20 and injuring almost a hundred others.

=== December ===
- December 11 – The first phase of the Nanning–Kunming High-Speed Railway, connecting Nanning to Baise, China, opens.
- (United Kingdom) December 13 – Apperley Bridge railway station reopens, fifty years after the original station was closed.
- (Singapore) December 27 – Downtown MRT line Stage 2 opens.
- December 30 – Construction begins on the Ningbo Rail Transit Line 3 (Yinfeng Line) in China.

=== Unknown date ===
- – Conclusion of joint project between Turkey, Iran and Pakistan to build 5,000 km freight link. Break-of-gauge arrangements to be confirmed.
