= Ningbo Railway Station metro station =

Metro station in Ningbo, China

Ningbo Railway Station 宁波火车站
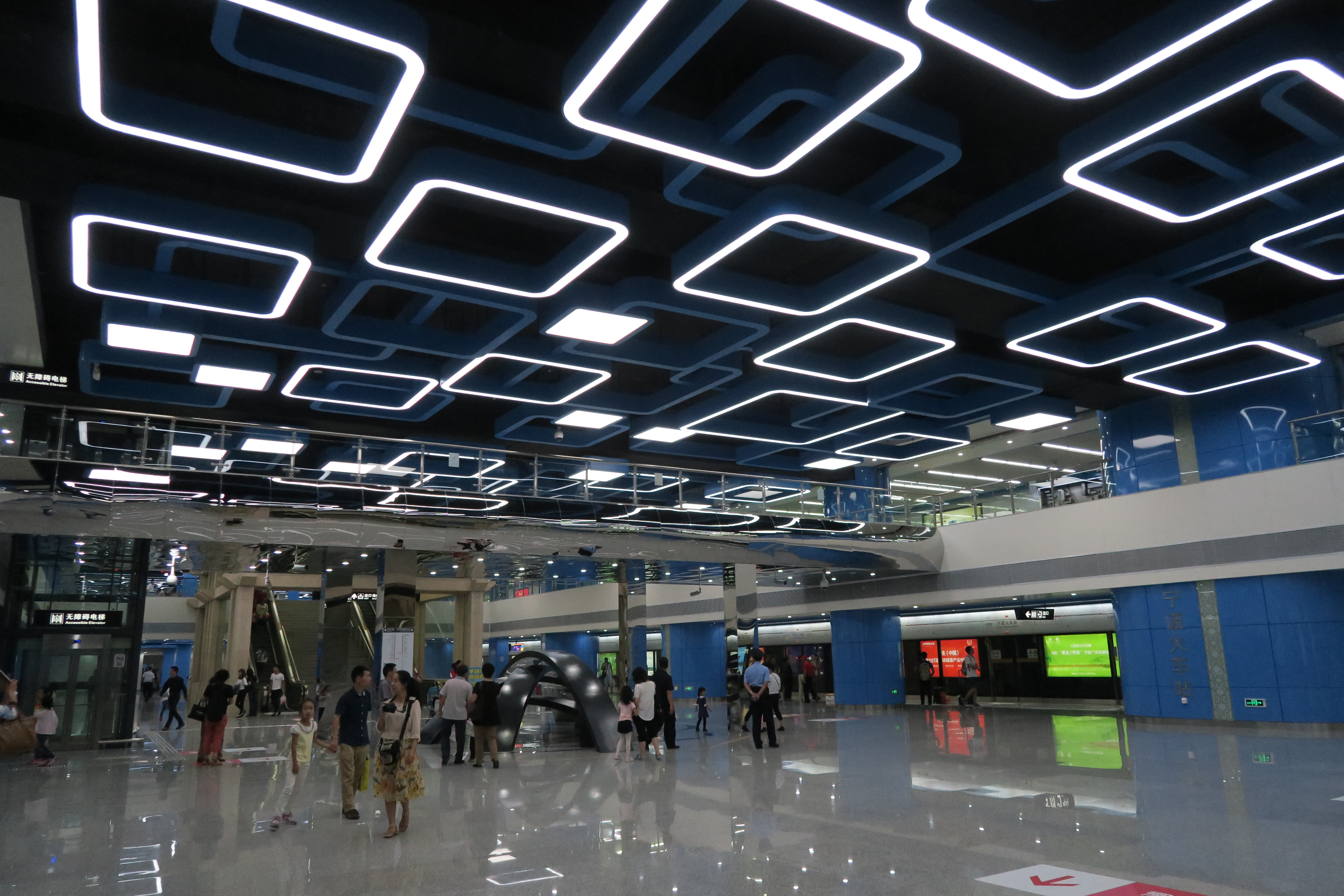

General information
- Location: Haishu District, Ningbo, Zhejiang; China
- Coordinates: 29°51′53″N 121°31′59″E
- Operated by: Ningbo Rail Transit Co. Ltd.
- Lines: Line 2; Line 4
- Platforms: 4 (2 island platform)

Construction
- Structure type: Underground

History
- Opened: September 26, 2015

Services
Preceding station	Ningbo Rail Transit	Following station
Yunxia Road towards Lishe International Airport	Line 2	Chenghuangmiao towards Honglian
Liuxi towards Cicheng West	Line 4	Xingning Bridge West towards International Conference Center
Location

Ningbo Railway Station is an underground metro station of Line 2 and Line 4 in Ningbo, Zhejiang, China. It situates under the station building of Ningbo Railway Station of China Railways. Passengers can transfer to intercity trains without going out of the station. Construction of the station started in late 2010, Line 2 station opened to service on September 26, 2015, and Line 4 station opened to service on December 23, 2020.

== Exits ==
Ningbo Railway Station has 2 exits on B1 floor of the China Railways station and 4 standalone exits.

Exit No.	Nearby destinations
A	North Square
B	South square, Rongan Shijia
C	South square, Ningbo South Bus Terminal
D	North Square
1	B1 floor north
2	B1 floor south
