= Gulou station (Ningbo Rail Transit) =

Ningbo Metro station

Gulou 鼓楼
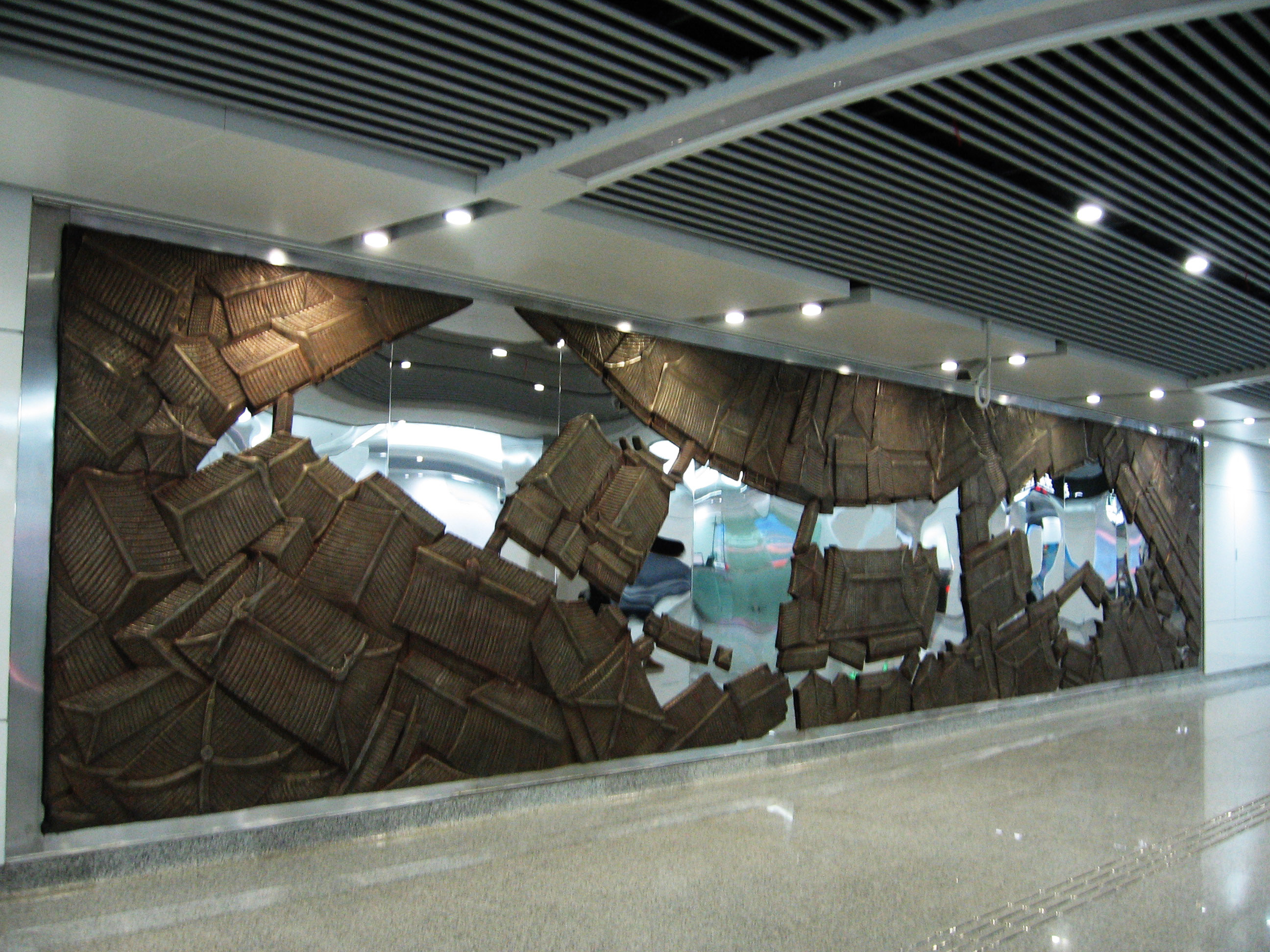

General information
- Location: Haishu District, Ningbo, Zhejiang; China
- Coordinates: 29.8756°N 121.5446°E
- Operated by: Ningbo Rail Transit Co. Ltd.
- Lines: Line 1; Line 2
- Platforms: 4 (2 island platform)
- Connections: Ningbo Bus Network

Construction
- Structure type: Underground

History
- Opened: 30 May 2014

Services
Preceding station	Ningbo Rail Transit	Following station
Ximenkou towards Gaoqiao West	Line 1	Dongmenkou towards Xiapu
Chenghuangmiao towards Lishe International Airport	Line 2	Waitan Bridge towards Honglian
Location

Gulou Station (simplified Chinese: 鼓楼站; traditional Chinese: 鼓樓站; pinyin: Gǔlóu Zhàn; lit. 'Drum Tower Station'), formly Gulou / Drum Tower Station, is a transfer station of Line 1 and Line 2 of the Ningbo Rail Transit that started operations on 30 May 2014. It is situated under Zhongshan Road (Chinese: 中山路) in Haishu District of Ningbo City, Zhejiang Province, eastern China.

== Exits ==
Exit number	Exit location
A	Zhongshan East Road
D	Jiefang North Road
E	Jiefang North Road
F	Zhongshan West Road
H	Zhongshan West Road
J	Zhongshan East Road

== Station layout ==
G	Street level	Exit/entrance
B1	Concourse	Ticketing, station service center, Ningbo Citizen Card service center, faregates
B2; Line 2 platform	Northbound	← toward Qingshuipu
B2; Line 2 platform	Island platform, doors will open on the left
B2; Line 2 platform	Southbound	toward Lishe International Airport →
B3; Line 1 platform	Westbound	← toward Xiapu
B3; Line 1 platform	Island platform, doors will open on the left
B3; Line 1 platform	Eastbound	toward Lishe International Airport →

== Connections ==
=== Ningbo Bus Network ===
The following bus connections can be made at this station:

Gulou Bus Station
39, 363, 364, 504, 821, 856 (night), 857 (night)
Gulou Bus Stop
2, 2-night, 3, 12, 12-AM peak, 12-PM peak, 14, 15, 19, 39, 50, 52, 58, 238, 380, 504, 515, 622, 637, 804, 804-night, 809, 820, 820-night, 852 (all-night)
Fuqiao Street Bus Stop
Routes 6, 30, 118, 305, 360, 380, 501, 516, 517, 527, 812, 819
Yangguang Square Bus Stop
Routes 2, 2-night, 15, 19, 28, 39, 58, 360, 503, 515, 517, 518, 789, 852 (all-night), 871 (night), 891 (night)

== Notable places nearby ==
Gulou (Drum Tower), Yongfengku Ruins Park, Yangguang Square, Haishu District Government, West Tower of Tianning Temple, Yuehu Park, Zhongshan Park
