= Ningbo University station =

Ningbo Metro station

Ningbo University 宁波大学
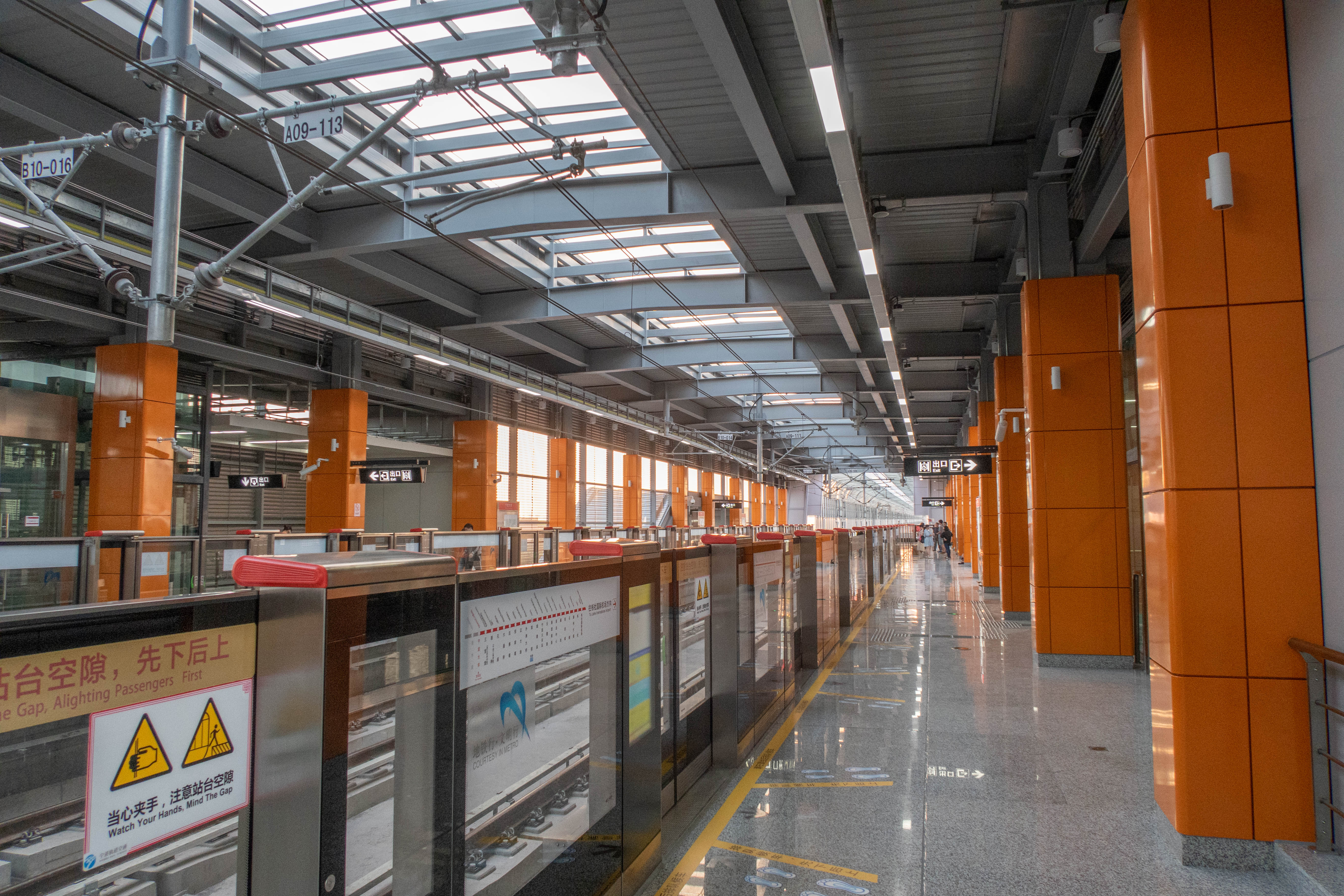

General information
- Location: Jiangbei District, Ningbo, Zhejiang; China
- Coordinates: 29.9117°N 121.6347°E
- Operated by: Ningbo Rail Transit Co. Ltd.
- Line: Line 2
- Platforms: 2 (2 side platforms)

Construction
- Structure type: Elevated

History
- Opened: 26 September 2015

Services
Preceding station	Ningbo Rail Transit	Following station
Sanguantang towards Lishe International Airport	Line 2	Qingshuipu towards Honglian
Location

Ningbo University Station is an elevated metro station in Ningbo, Zhejiang, China. It situates on Ningzhen Road, on the west of main entrance of Ningbo University. Construction of the station started in middle 2012 and opened to service in September 26, 2015.

== Exits ==
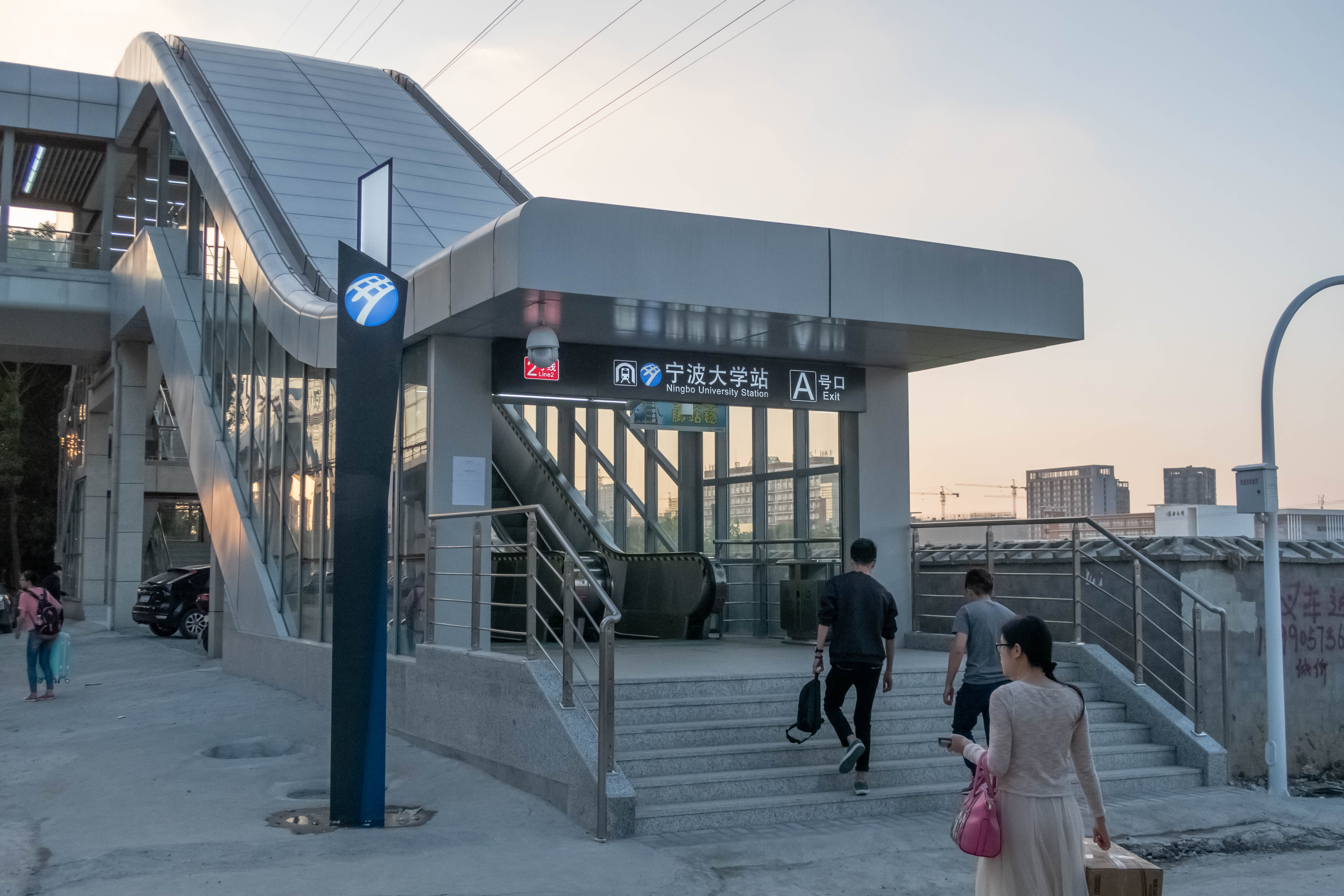
Exit A, Ningbo University Station

Ningbo University Station has 2 exits.

No	Suggested destinations
A	Zhuangshi Avenue
B	Ningbo University
