= Honglian station (Ningbo Rail Transit) =

Metro station in Ningbo, China

Honglian 红联
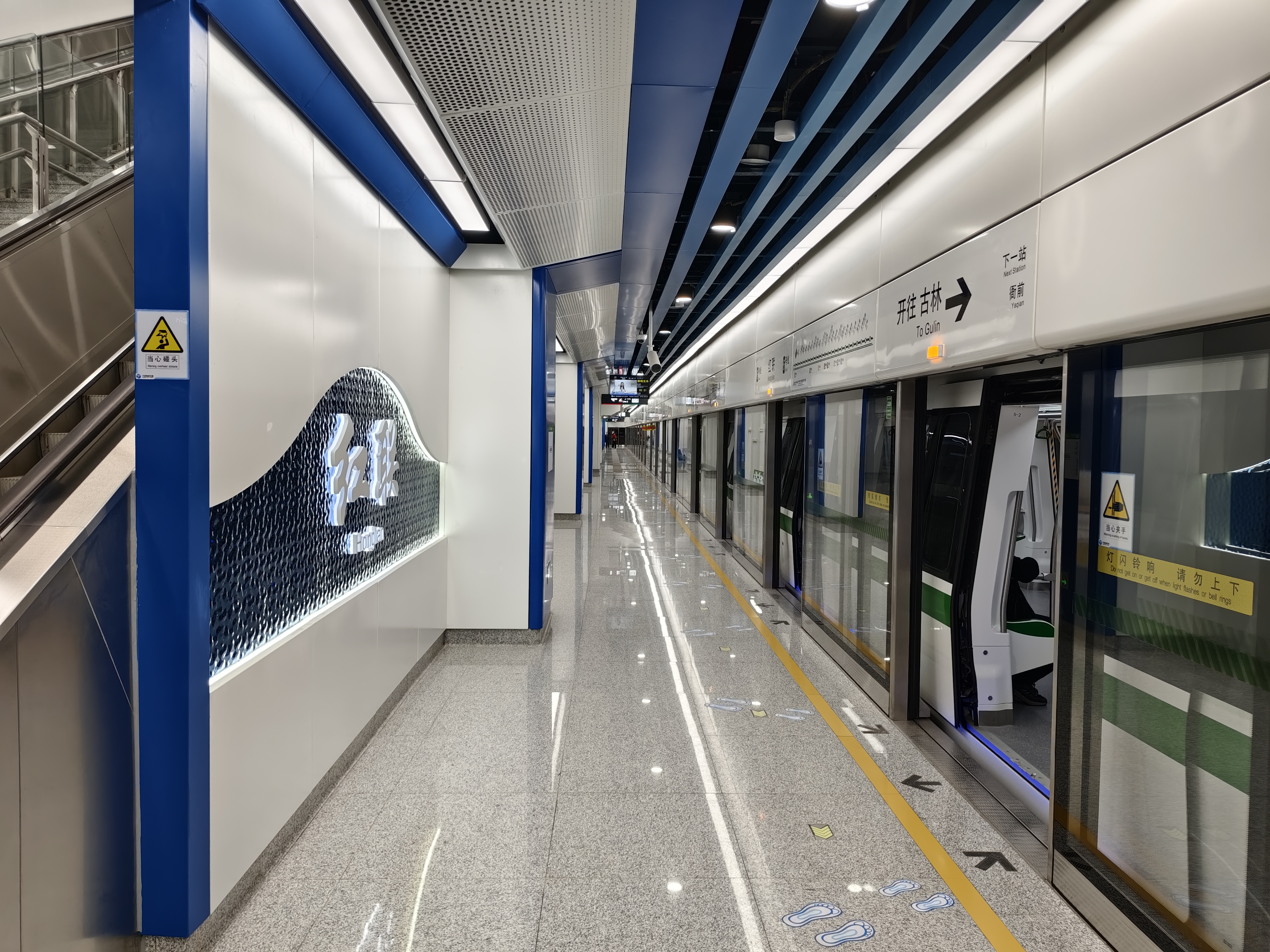
- Platform of Line 6

Chinese name
- Simplified Chinese: 红联站
- Traditional Chinese: 紅聯站
Transcriptions
Standard Mandarin
- Hanyu Pinyin: Hónglián Zhàn

General information
- Location: Dukou Road (渡口路) × Jiangnan East Road; Beilun District, Ningbo, Zhejiang; China
- Coordinates: 29°56′29″N 121°43′11″E
- System: Ningbo Rail Transit
- Operator: Ningbo Rail Transit Co. Ltd.
- Lines: Line 2 Line 6
- Platforms: 4 (2 island platforms)
- Tracks: 4

Construction
- Structure type: Underground
- Platform levels: 2
- Accessible: Yes

History
- Opened: 1 December 2022 (Line 2); 16 January 2026 (Line 6)

Services
Preceding station	Ningbo Rail Transit	Following station
Zhaobaoshan towards Lishe International Airport	Line 2	Terminus
Yaqian towards Gulin	Line 6	Terminus
Route map
Location

Honglian (Chinese: 红联) is an underground metro station on Line 2 and Line 6 of Ningbo Rail Transit. It is located on the intersection of Dukou Road and Jiangnan East Road in Beilun District, Ningbo, China. Line 2 started its construction on 15 March 2019 and began its service on 1 December 2022. Line 6 began its service on 16 January 2026.

== Description ==
The part of Line 2 is located beneath Dukou Road, while Line 6 lies beneath Jiangnan East Road. Two lines are arranged in a T-shaped, with stairs connecting two platforms.

The concourse is on basement 1, the Line 2 platform is on basement 2, and the Line 6 platform is on basement 3. Each of these consists of an island platform with two tracks.

On the south side of the Line 2 platform, there are two sidings for trains to reverse beyond the station. On the west side of the Line 6 platform, a set of crossover tracks is provided for trains to reverse before entering the station; currently, only the north platform is in use.

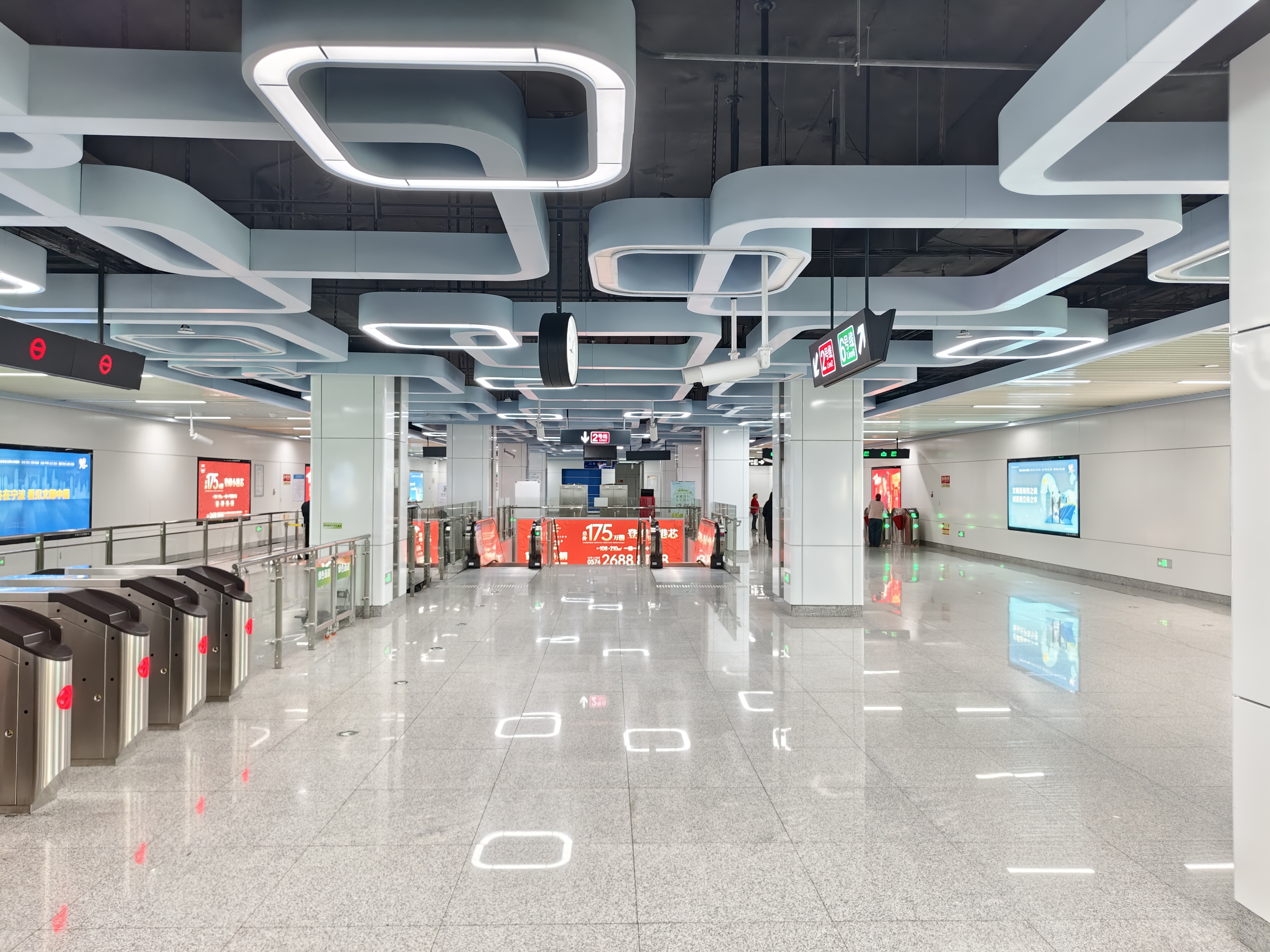
Line 2 concourse

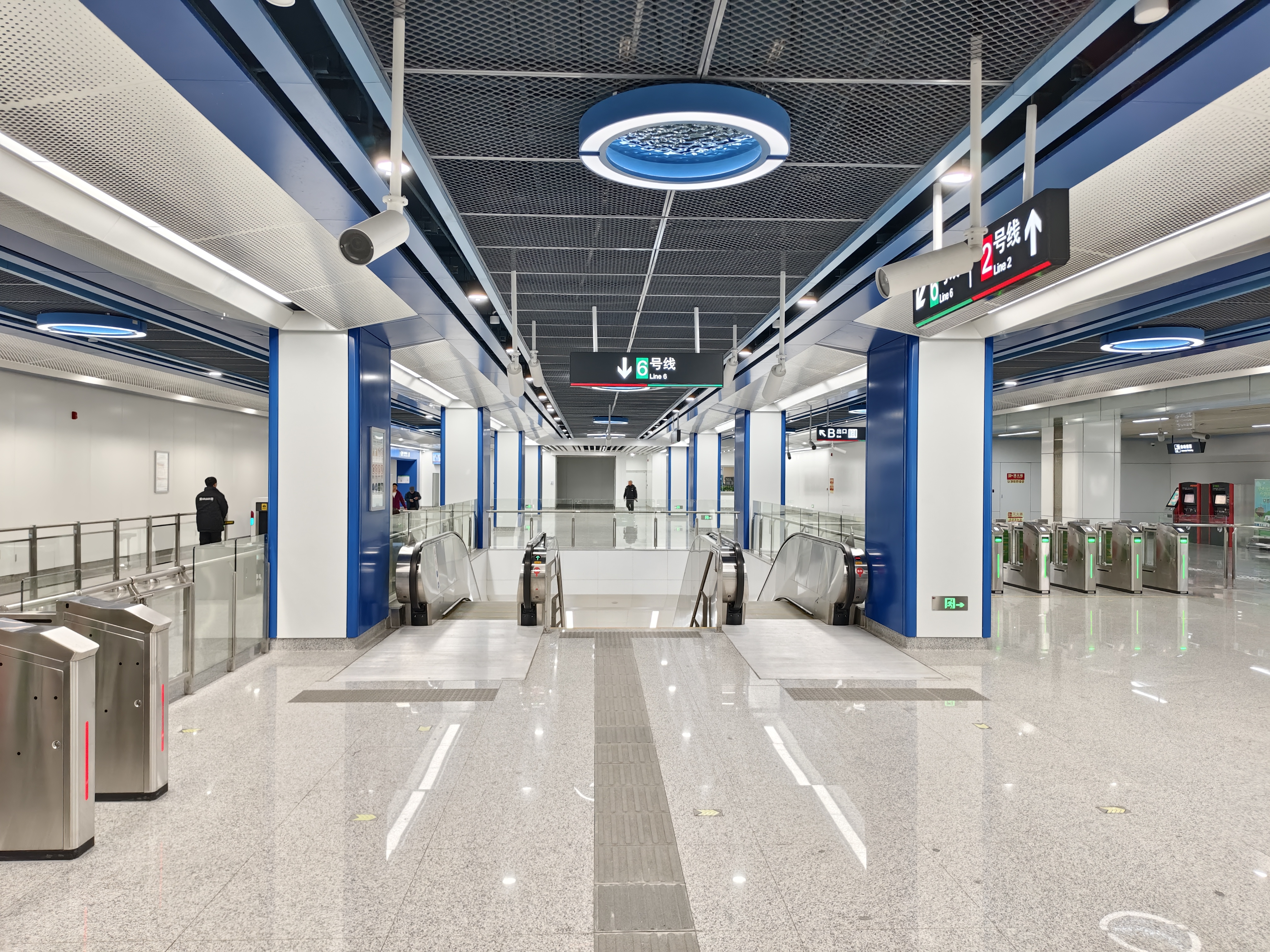
Line 6 concourse

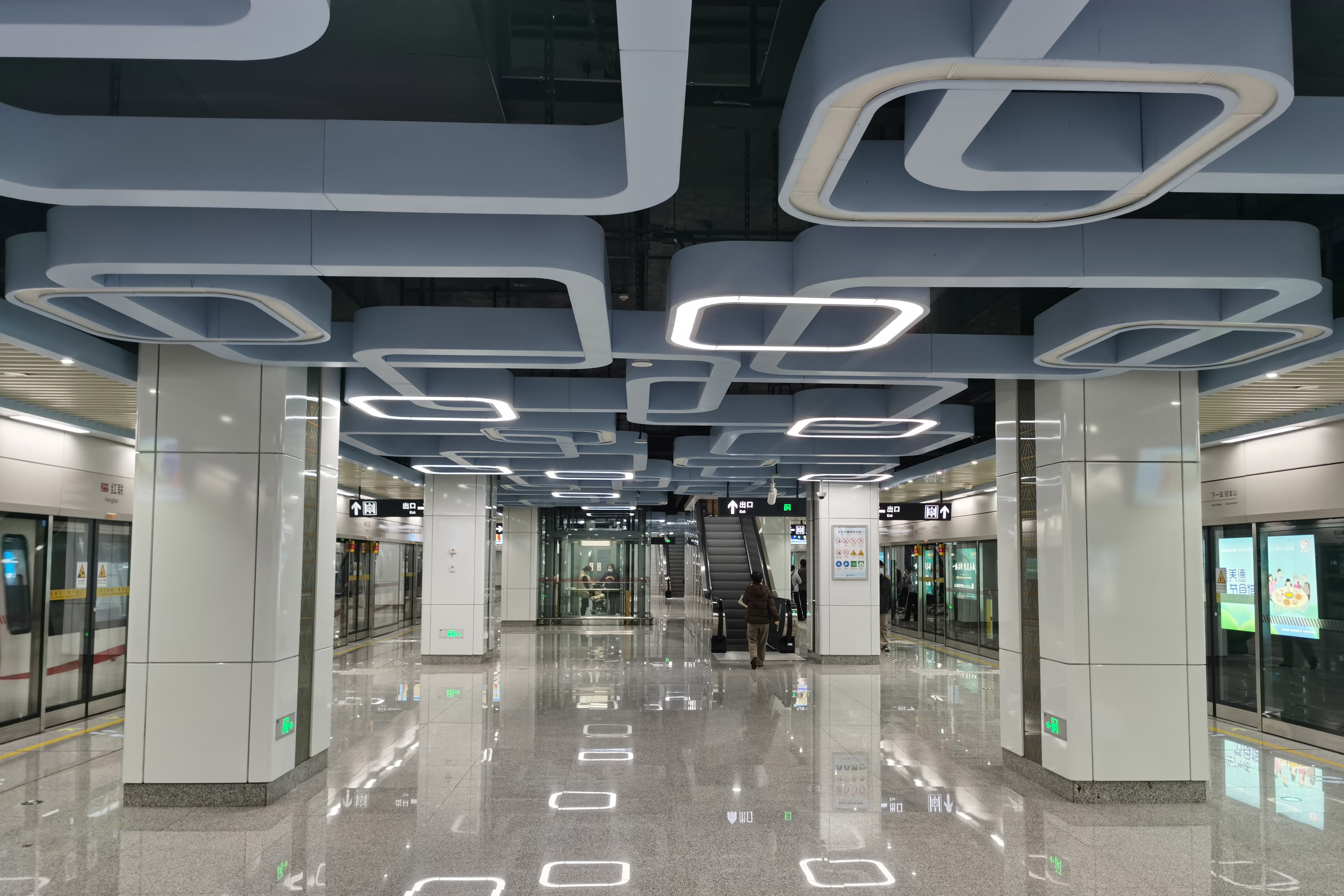
Line 2 platforms in 2022

== Exits ==
- A: south side of Jiangnan East Road, east side of Dukou Road
- B: north side of Jiangnan East Road, east side of Dukou Road
- C: north side of Jiangnan East Road, west side of Dukou Road, Xingpu Street (兴浦街)
- D: south side of Jiangnan East Road, Jingyi Road (经一路)
- E: west side of Dukou Road
