= Nijiayan station =

Ningbo Metro station

Coordinates: 29.8985°N 121.5667°E

Nijiayan 倪家堰
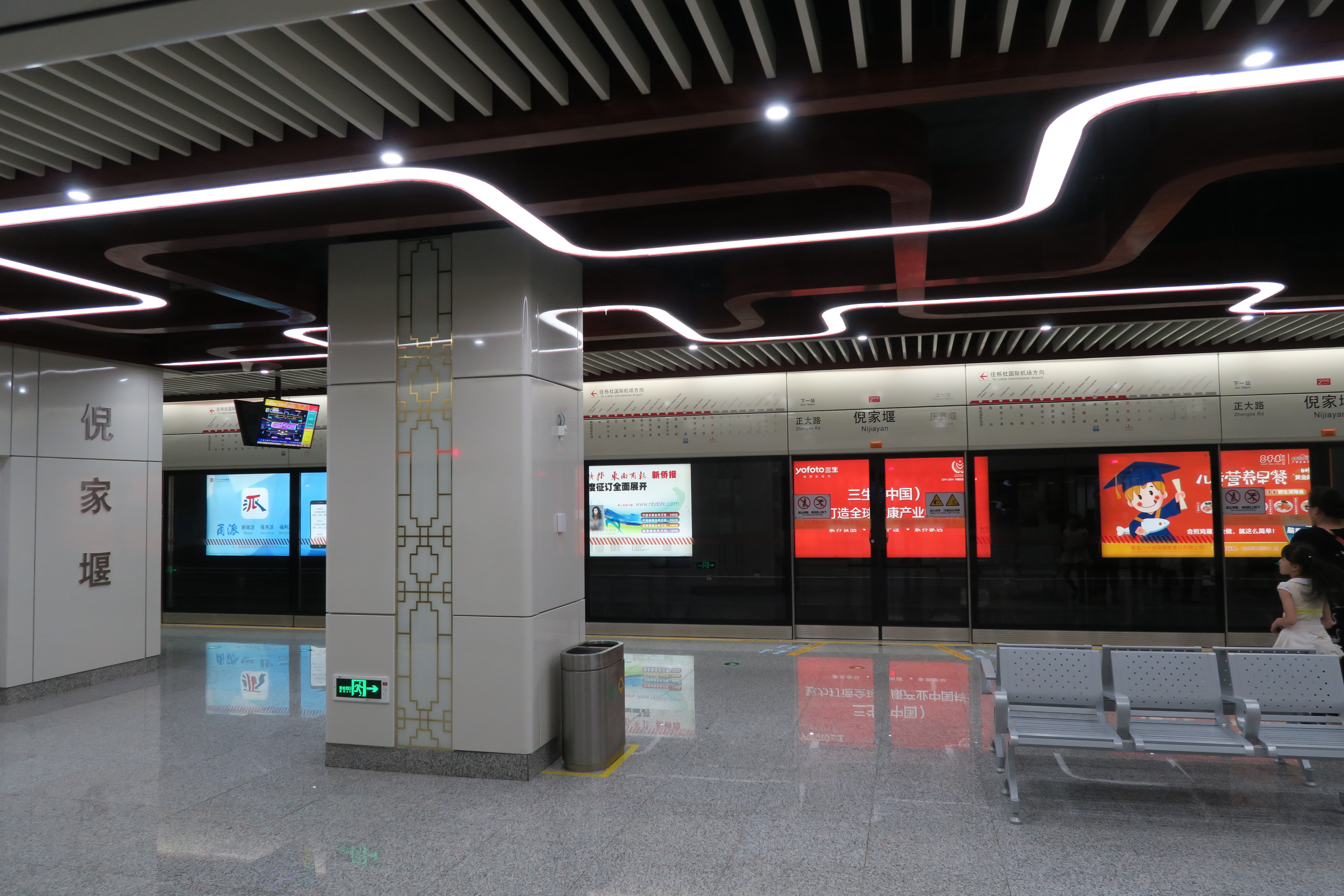

General information
- Location: Haishu District, Ningbo, Zhejiang; China
- Operated by: Ningbo Rail Transit Co. Ltd.
- Line(s): Line 2
- Platforms: 2 (1 island platform)

Construction
- Structure type: Underground

History
- Opened: September 26, 2015

Services
Preceding station	Ningbo Rail Transit	Following station
Zhengda Road towards Lishe International Airport	Line 2	Yasaiyan towards Honglian

Nijiayan Station is an underground metro station in Ningbo, Zhejiang, China. Nijiayan Station situates on Hudong Road, Near Rihu Park. Construction of the station started in December 2010 and the station opened to service on September 26, 2015.

== Exits ==
Nijiayan Station has 3 exits.

Exit No.	Nearby destinations
A	Huancheng North Road, Jiangbei Public Security Bureau
B	Rihu Park, Rihu Wedding Plaza
D	Huancheng North Road
