= Lulin station =

Ningbo Metro station

Coordinates: 29.9091°N 121.6127°E

Lulin 路林
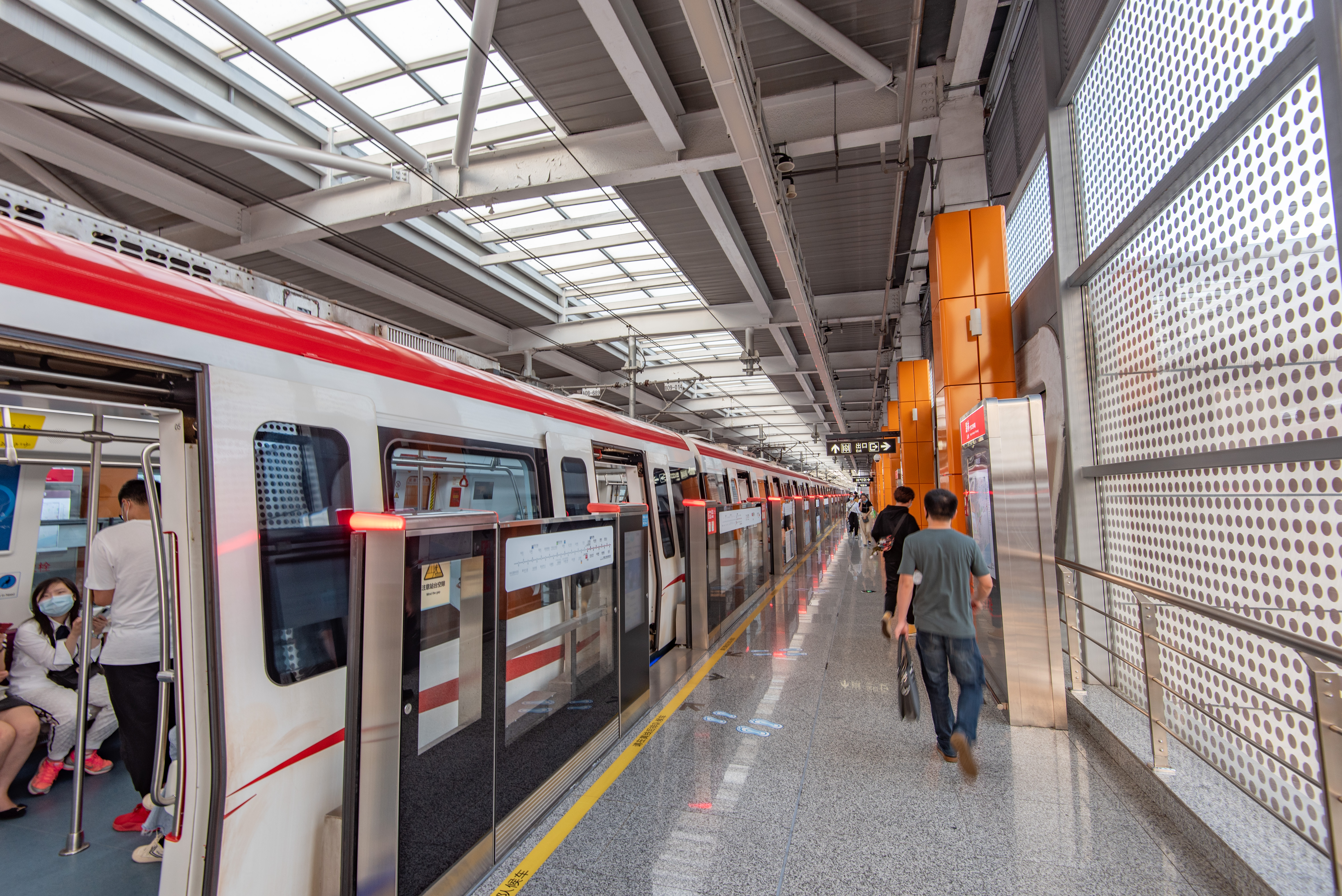

General information
- Location: Jiangbei District, Ningbo, Zhejiang; China
- Operated by: Ningbo Rail Transit Co. Ltd.
- Line: Line 2
- Platforms: 2 (2 side platforms)

Construction
- Structure type: Elevated

History
- Opened: 26 September 2015

Services
Preceding station	Ningbo Rail Transit	Following station
Kongpu towards Lishe International Airport	Line 2	Sanguantang towards Honglian
Location

Lulin Station is an elevated metro station of Line 2 in Ningbo, Zhejiang, China. It situates on Fenghua Road. Construction of the station started in middle 2012 and opened to service in September 26, 2015.

== Exits ==
Lulin Station has 2 exits.

Exit No.	Suggested destinations
A	Ningbo College of Engineering
B	Yong'an Bus Company
