= Zhengda Road station =

Ningbo Metro station

Coordinates: 29.8898°N 121.5621°E

Zhengda Road 正大路
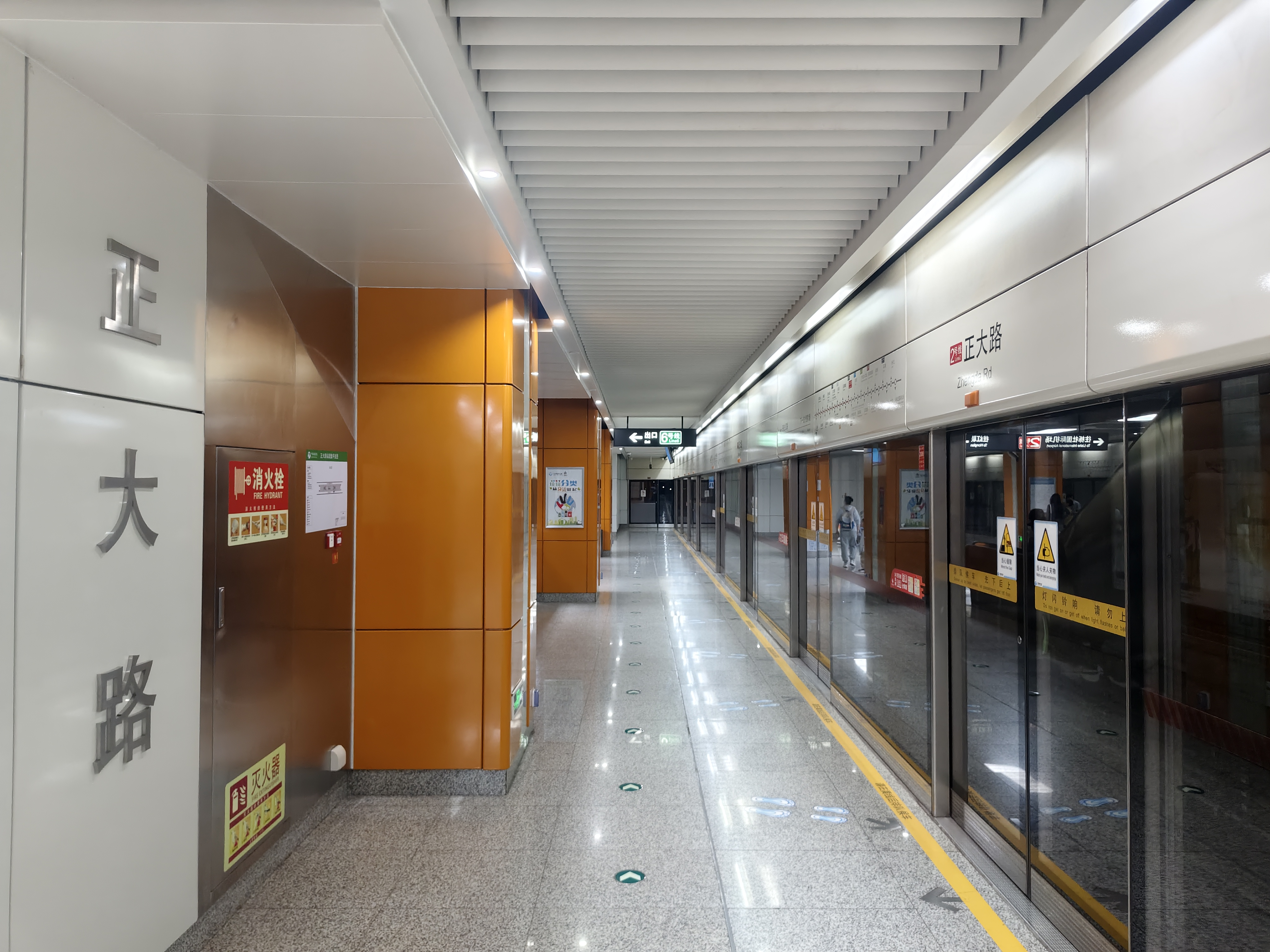
- Line 2 platform

General information
- Location: Haishu District, Ningbo, Zhejiang; China
- Operator: Ningbo Rail Transit Co. Ltd.
- Lines: Line 2 Line 6
- Platforms: 2 (1 island platform)

Construction
- Structure type: Underground

History
- Opened: 26 September 2015 (Line 2); 16 January 2026 (Line 6)

Services
Preceding station	Ningbo Rail Transit	Following station
Waitan Bridge towards Lishe International Airport	Line 2	Nijiayan towards Honglian
Ningbo Grand Theater towards Gulin	Line 6	Qingfeng Bridge East towards Honglian
Location

Zhengda Road Station is an underground metro station in Ningbo, Zhejiang, China. Zhengda Road Station situates on the crossing of Daqing South Road and Zhengda Road. Construction of the station started in December 2010 and it opened to service on September 26, 2015. Line 6 opened on January 16, 2026.

== Exits ==
Zhengda Road Station has 4 exits.

No	Suggested destinations
A	Zhengda Road
C	Daqing South Road
E1	Tongtu Road, Shengbao Road
E2	Tongtu Road, Shengbao Road
