= Yasaiyan station =

Ningbo Metro station

Coordinates: 29.9036°N 121.5757°E

Yasaiyan 压赛堰
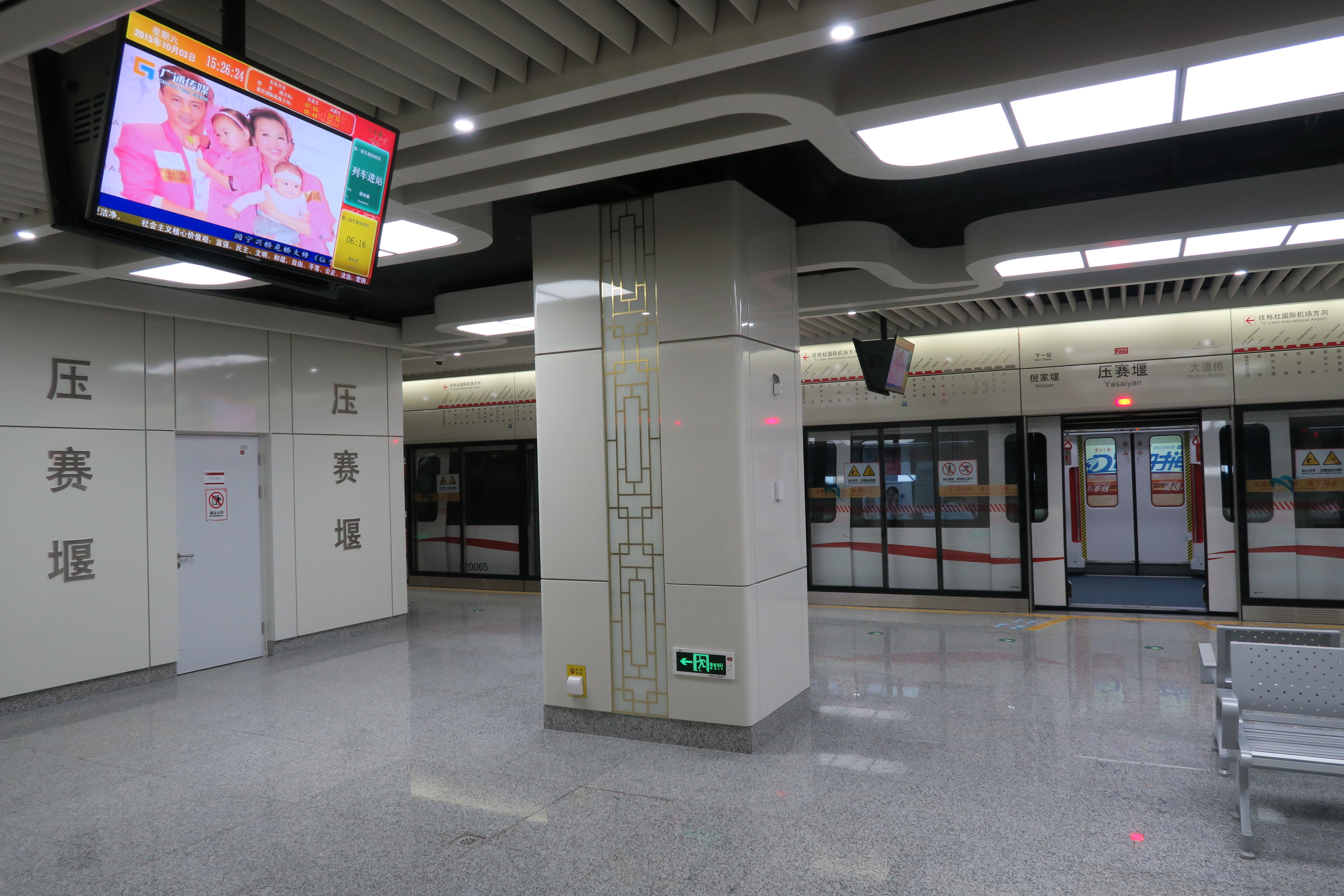

General information
- Location: Haishu District, Ningbo, Zhejiang; China
- Operated by: Ningbo Rail Transit Co. Ltd.
- Line(s): Line 2
- Platforms: 2 (1 island platform)

Construction
- Structure type: Underground

History
- Opened: 26 September 2015

Services
| Preceding station | Ningbo Rail Transit | Following station |
|---|---|---|
| Nijiayan towards Lishe International Airport | Line 2 | Datong Bridge towards Honglian |

Yasaiyan Station is an underground metro station in Ningbo, Zhejiang, China. Yasaiyan Station situates on the crossing of Qingyun Rnad and Gaojie Road. Construction of the station started in December 2010 and the station opened to service on September 26, 2015.

== Exits ==
Yasaiyan Station has 6 exits.

| No | Suggested destinations |
|---|---|
| A | Gaojie Road |
| B | Gaojie Road |
| C | Qingyun Road, Ningbo Railway Logistics Company |
| D | Qingyun Road, Ningbo Railway Logistics Company |
| E | Gaojie Road |
| F | Qingyun Road |
