= Kongpu station =

Ningbo Metro station

Coordinates: 29.9043°N 121.5925°E

Kongpu 孔浦
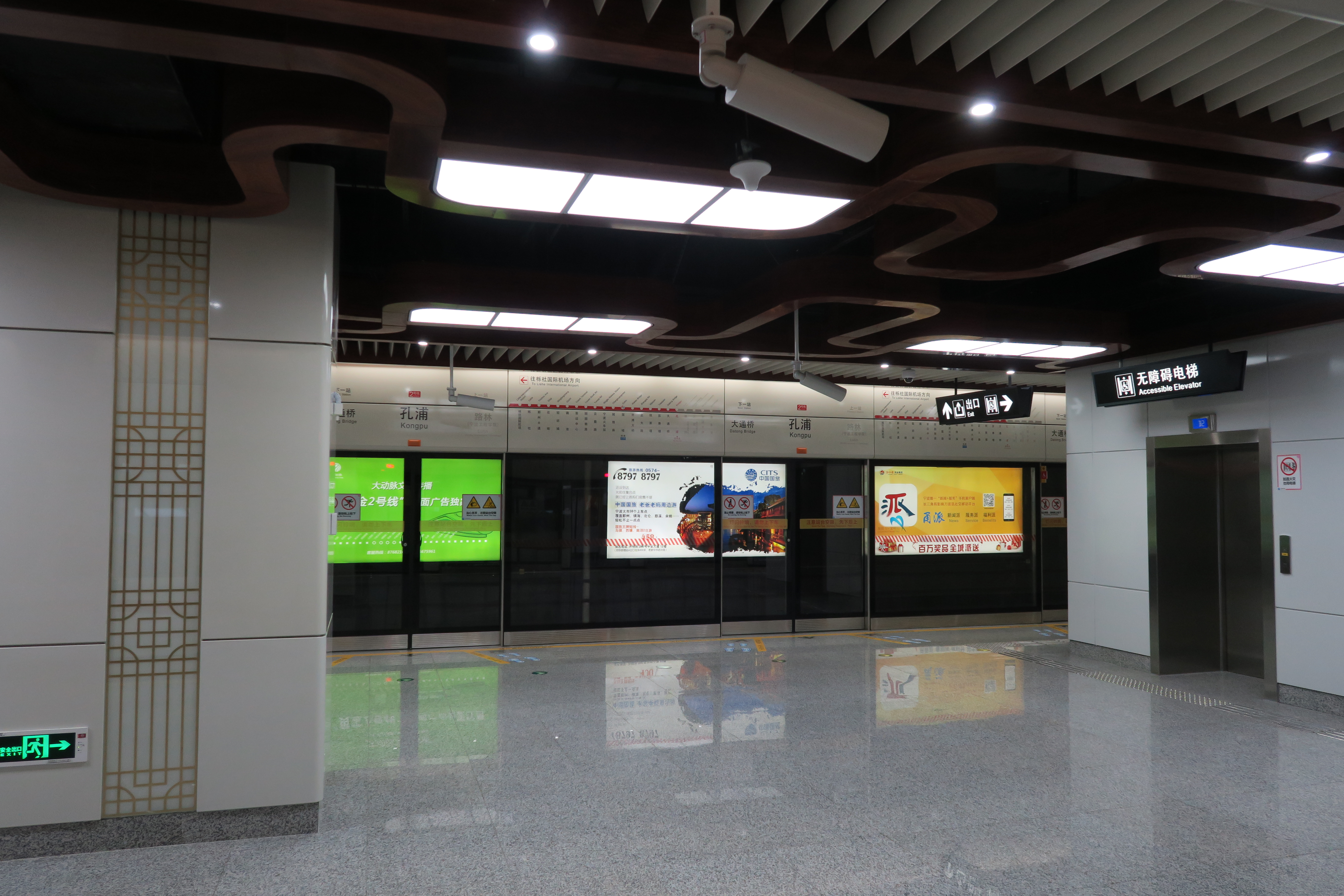

General information
- Location: Haishu District, Ningbo, Zhejiang; China
- Operated by: Ningbo Rail Transit Co. Ltd.
- Line(s): Line 2
- Platforms: 2 (1 island platform)

Construction
- Structure type: Underground

History
- Opened: September 26, 2015

Services
| Preceding station | Ningbo Rail Transit | Following station |
|---|---|---|
| Datong Bridge towards Lishe International Airport | Line 2 | Lulin towards Honglian |

Kongpu Station is an underground metro station in Ningbo, Zhejiang, China. Kongpu Station situates on the crossing of Huancheng North Road and Meiyan Road. Construction of the station started in December 2010 and it opened to service on September 26, 2015.

== Exits ==
Kongpu Station has 2 exits.

| No | Suggested destinations |
|---|---|
| B | Kongpu Middle School |
| D | Meiyan Road |
