= Ouchi station (Ningbo Rail Transit) =

Ningbo Metro station

Coordinates: 29.8415°N 121.5127°E

Ouchi 藕池
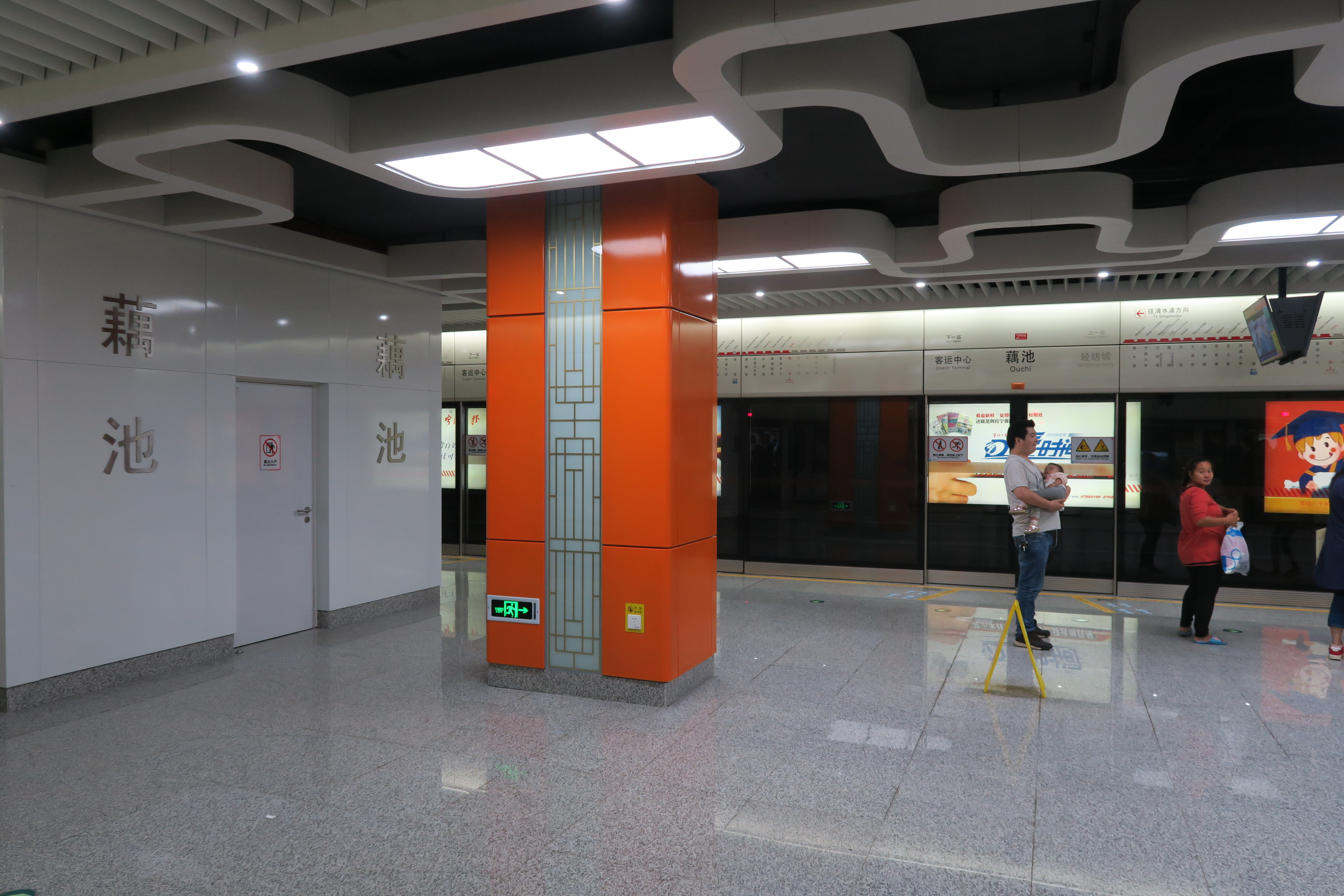

General information
- Location: Haishu District, Ningbo, Zhejiang; China
- Operated by: Ningbo Rail Transit Co. Ltd.
- Line(s): Line 2
- Platforms: 2 (1 island platform)

Construction
- Structure type: Underground

History
- Opened: September 26, 2015

Services
Preceding station	Ningbo Rail Transit	Following station
Qingfangcheng towards Lishe International Airport	Line 2	Coach Terminal towards Honglian

Ouchi Station is an underground metro station in Ningbo, Zhejiang, China. It situates on the crossing of Qiyun Road and Liyuan South Road. Construction of the station started in December 2010; the station opened to service on September 26, 2015.

== Exits ==
Ouchi Station has 2 exits.

No	Suggested destinations
A	Liyuan South Road
B	Zhengu Bridge
