= Yinzhou Avenue station =

Metro station in Ningbo, China

Coordinates: 29.8178°N 121.4960°E

Yinzhou Avenue 鄞州大道
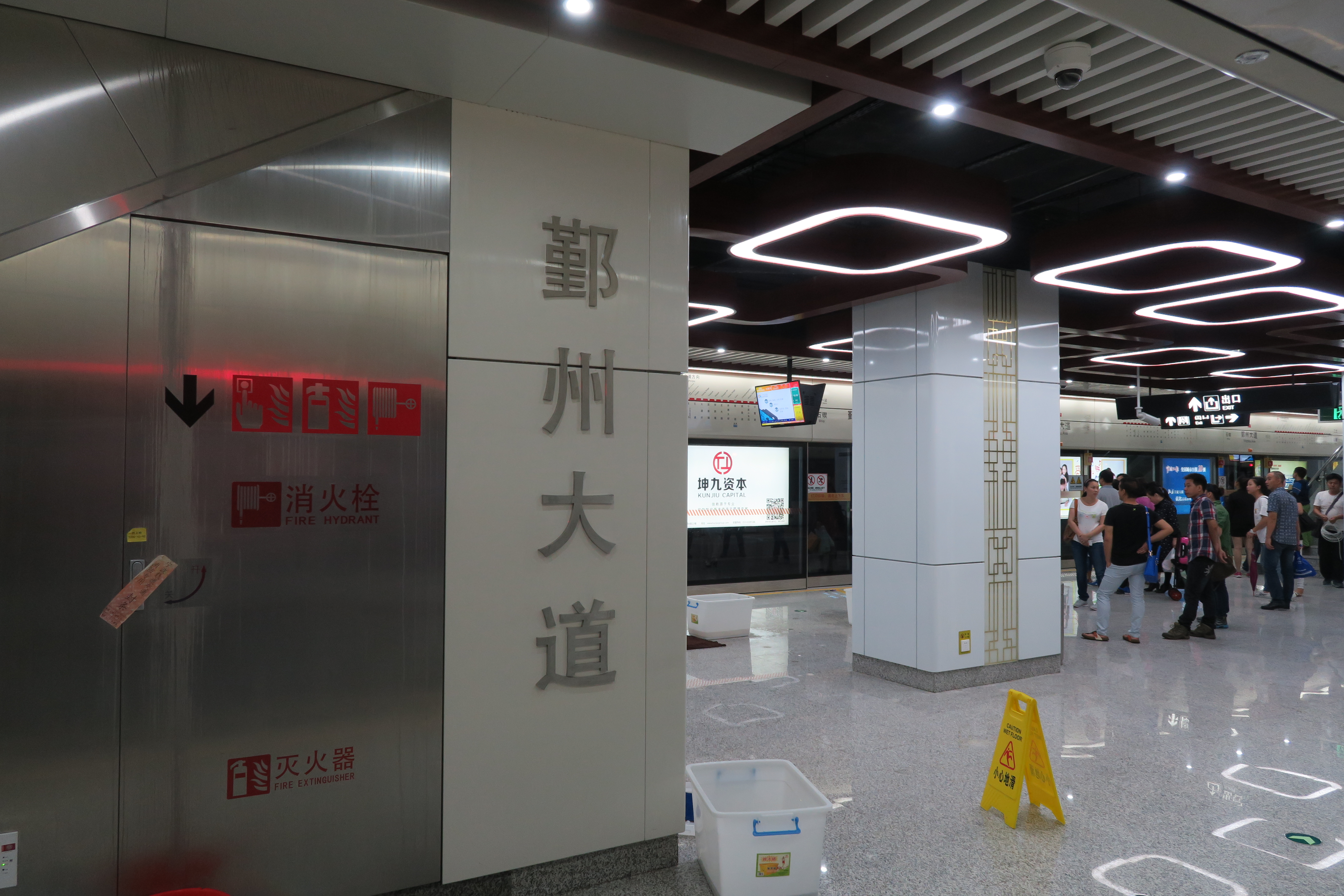

General information
- Location: Haishu District, Ningbo, Zhejiang; China
- Operated by: Ningbo Rail Transit Co. Ltd.
- Line: Line 2
- Platforms: 2 (1 island platform)

Construction
- Structure type: Underground

History
- Opened: 26 September 2015

Services
Preceding station	Ningbo Rail Transit	Following station
Lishe towards Lishe International Airport	Line 2	Shiqi towards Honglian
Location

Yinzhou Avenue Station is an underground metro station in Ningbo, Zhejiang, China. It is situated on the crossing of Yongor Avenue and Wancheng Road. Construction of the station started in December 2010 and it began service on September 26, 2015.

== Exits ==
Yinzhou Avenue Station has 3 exits.

No	Suggested destinations
A	Yongor Avenue, Yinzhou Avenue
B	Wancheng Road
D	Yongor Avenue
