= Yunxia Road station =

Ningbo Metro station

Coordinates: 29.8587°N 121.5266°E

Yunxia Road 云霞路
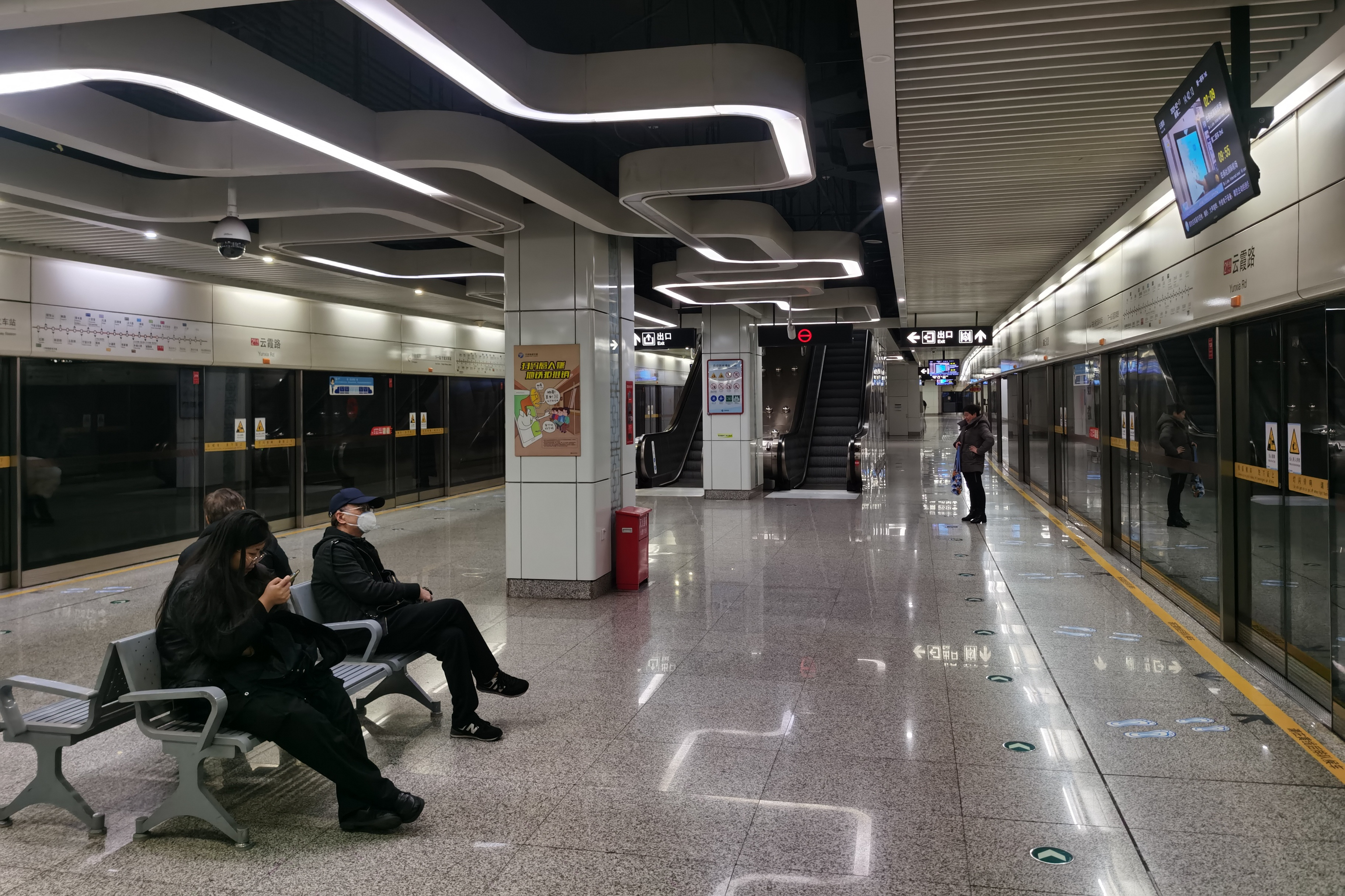

General information
- Location: Haishu District, Ningbo, Zhejiang; China
- Operated by: Ningbo Rail Transit Co. Ltd.
- Line: Line 2
- Platforms: 2 (1 island platform)

Construction
- Structure type: Underground

History
- Opened: 26 September 2015

Services
Preceding station	Ningbo Rail Transit	Following station
Liyuan South Road towards Lishe International Airport	Line 2	Ningbo Railway Station towards Honglian
Location

Yunxia Road Station is an underground metro station in Ningbo, Zhejiang, China. It is situated on the crossing of Hengchun Street and Huancheng West Road. Construction of the station started in December 2010 and it opened to service on September 26, 2015.

== Exits ==
Yunxia Road Station has 3 exits.

No	Suggested destinations
B	Lianfeng Middle School
C	Ningbo TV
D	Yunxia Road
