= Liyuan South Road station =

Ningbo Metro station

Coordinates: 29.8583°N 121.5189°E

Liyuan South Road 丽园南路
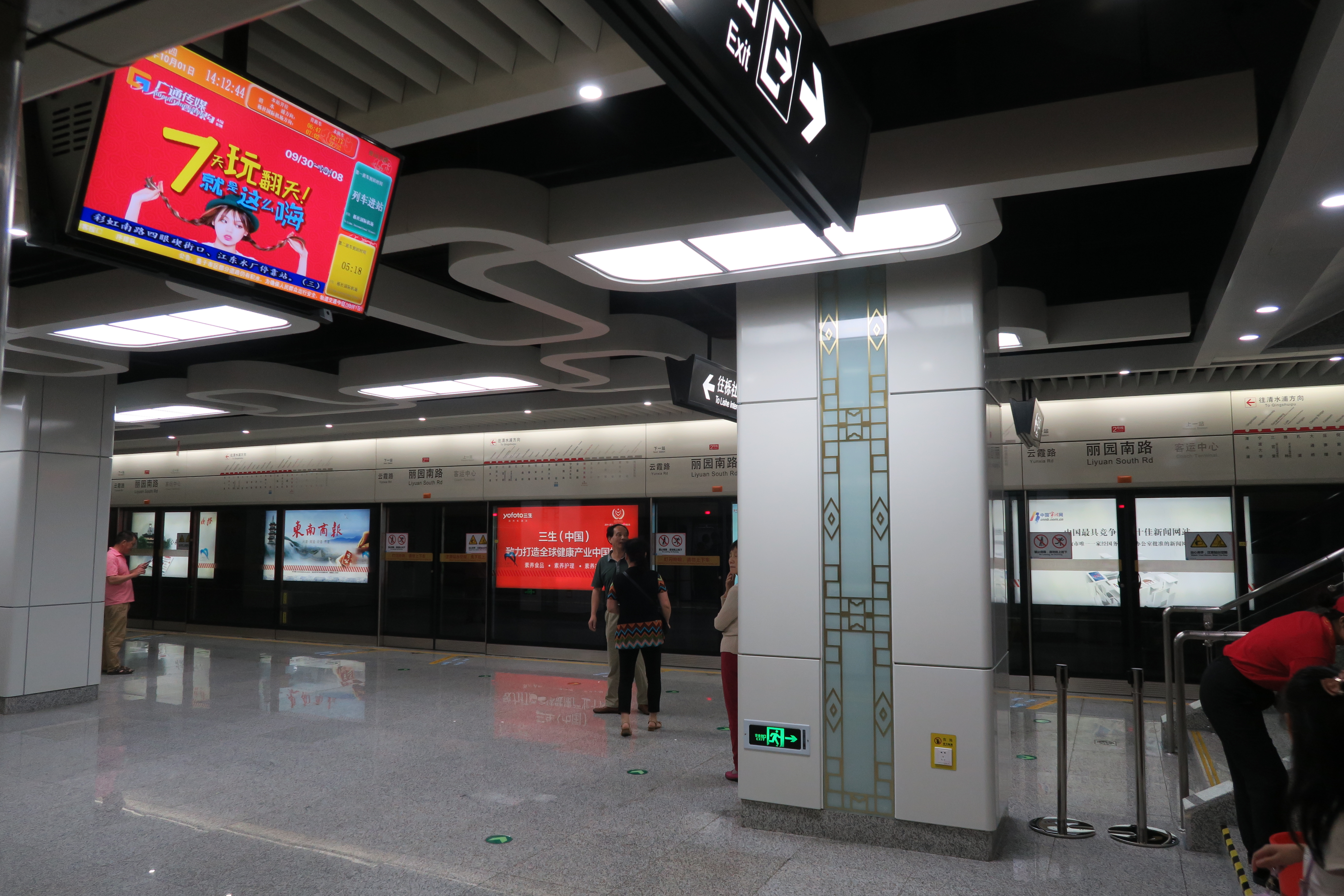
- Line 2 platform

General information
- Location: Haishu District, Ningbo, Zhejiang; China
- Operator: Ningbo Rail Transit Co. Ltd.
- Lines: Line 2 Line 8
- Platforms: 2 (1 island platform)

Construction
- Structure type: Underground

History
- Opened: 26 September 2015 (Line 2); 30 June 2025 (Line 8)

Services
| Preceding station | Ningbo Rail Transit | Following station |
|---|---|---|
| Coach Terminal towards Lishe International Airport | Line 2 | Yunxia Road towards Honglian |
| Lianfeng towards Kaiyuan Road | Line 8 | Nanyuan towards Hansong Road |
Location

Liyuan South Road Station is an underground metro station in Ningbo, Zhejiang, China. It is located at the crossing of Xindian Road and Liyuan South Road. Construction of the station started in December 2010 and it opened on September 26, 2015. Line 8 opened on 30 June 2025.

== Exits ==
Liyuan South Road Station has 4 exits.

| No | Suggested destinations |
|---|---|
| A | Liyuan South Road (east), Qixiang Road |
| B | Liyuan South Road, Qixiang Road |
| C | Liyuan South Road, Xindian Road |
| D | Liyuan South Road, Xindian Road |
