= Coach Terminal station =

Metro station in Ningbo, China

Coordinates: 29.8509°N 121.5124°E

Coach Terminal 客运中心
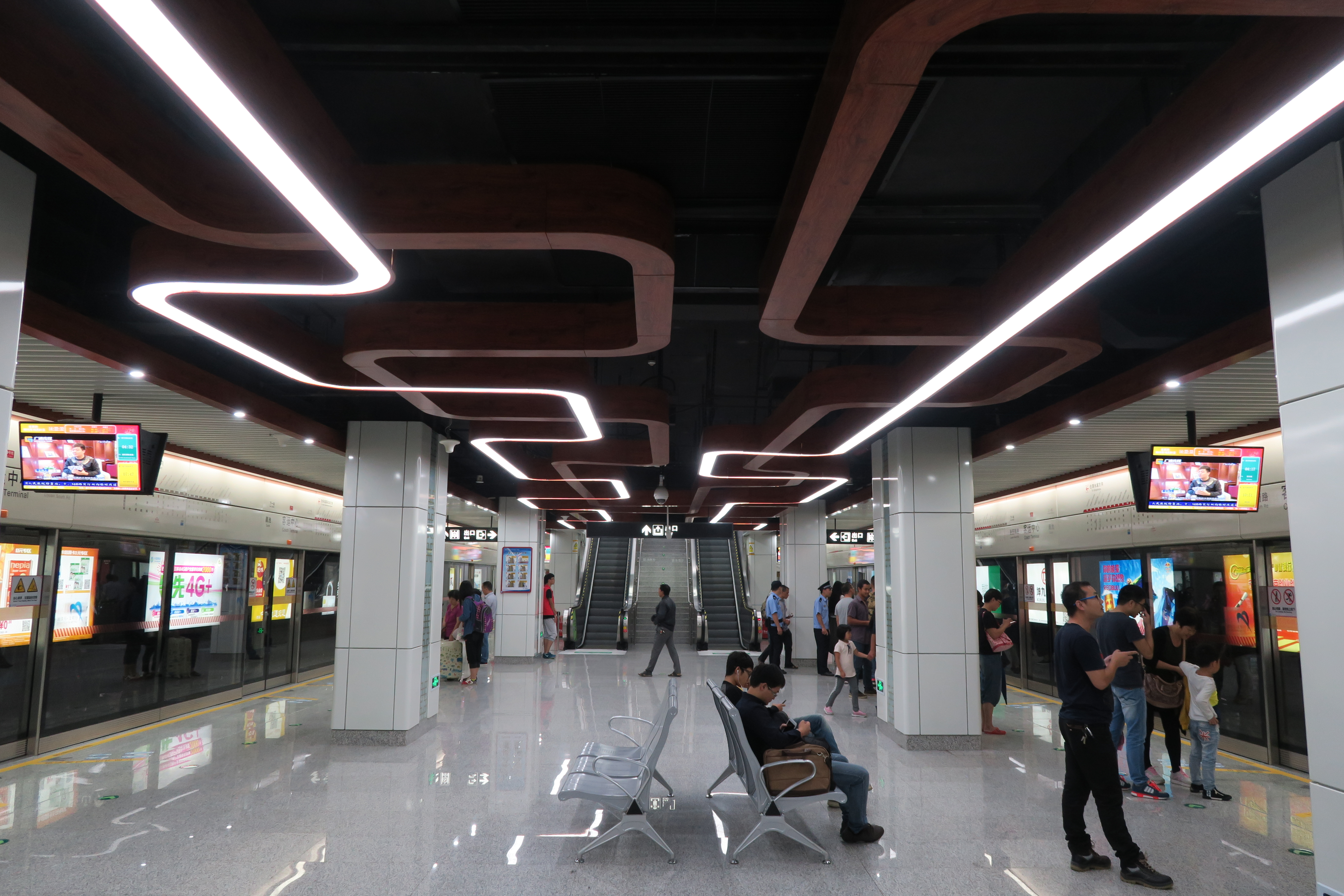

General information
- Location: Haishu District, Ningbo, Zhejiang; China
- Operated by: Ningbo Rail Transit Co. Ltd.
- Line(s): Line 2
- Platforms: 2 (1 island platform)

Construction
- Structure type: Underground

History
- Opened: September 26, 2015

Services
Preceding station	Ningbo Rail Transit	Following station
Ouchi towards Lishe International Airport	Line 2	Liyuan South Road towards Honglian

Coach Terminal Station is an underground metro station in Ningbo, Zhejiang, China. Coach Terminal Station is situated on the east of Ningbo Coach Terminal. Construction of the station started in December 2010 and the station opened to service on September 26, 2015.

== Exits ==
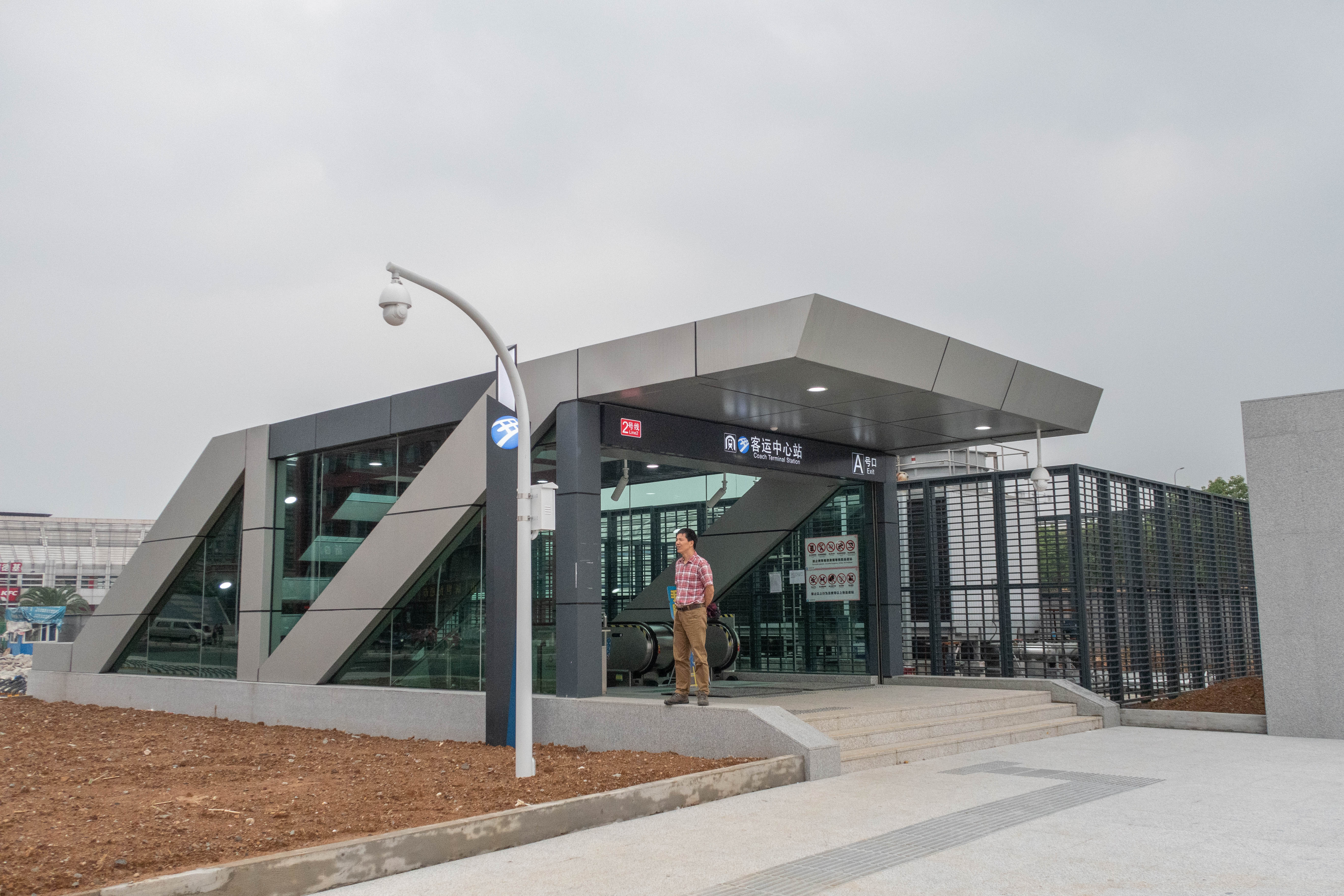
Exit A, Coach Terminal Station

Coach Terminal Station has 3 exits.

No	Suggested destinations
A	Tongda Road, Ningbo Coach Terminal
B	Tongda Road, Ningbo Coach Terminal
D	Tongda Road, Duantang Public Transit Station
