= Waitan Bridge station =

Ningbo Metro station

Coordinates: 29.8831°N 121.5590°E

Waitan Bridge 外滩大桥
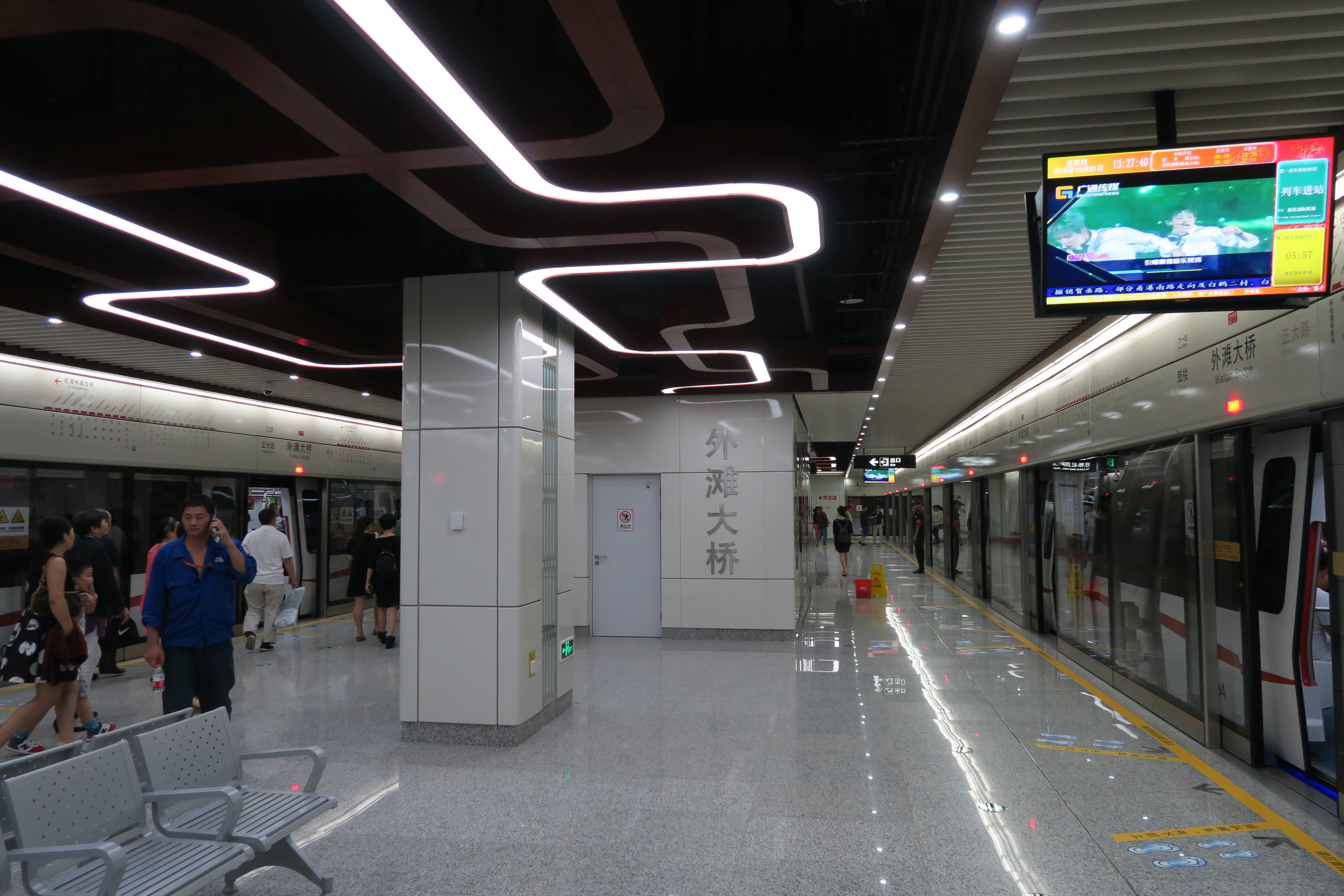
- Line 2 platform

General information
- Location: Jiangbei District, Ningbo, Zhejiang; China
- Operator: Ningbo Rail Transit Co. Ltd.
- Lines: Line 2 Line 7
- Platforms: 2 (1 island platform)

Construction
- Structure type: Underground

History
- Opened: 26 September 2015 (Line 2); 29 August 2025 (Line 7)

Services
Preceding station	Ningbo Rail Transit	Following station
Gulou towards Lishe International Airport	Line 2	Zhengda Road towards Honglian
Ningbo Grand Theatre towards Yufan	Line 7	Shuguang towards Yunlong
Location

Waitan Bridge Station is an underground metro station in Ningbo, Zhejiang, China. Waitan Bridge Station situates on Daqing North Road at the crossing of Jingjia Road. Construction of the station starts in December 2010 and opened to service on September 26, 2015.Line 7 opened on 29 August 2025.

== Exits ==
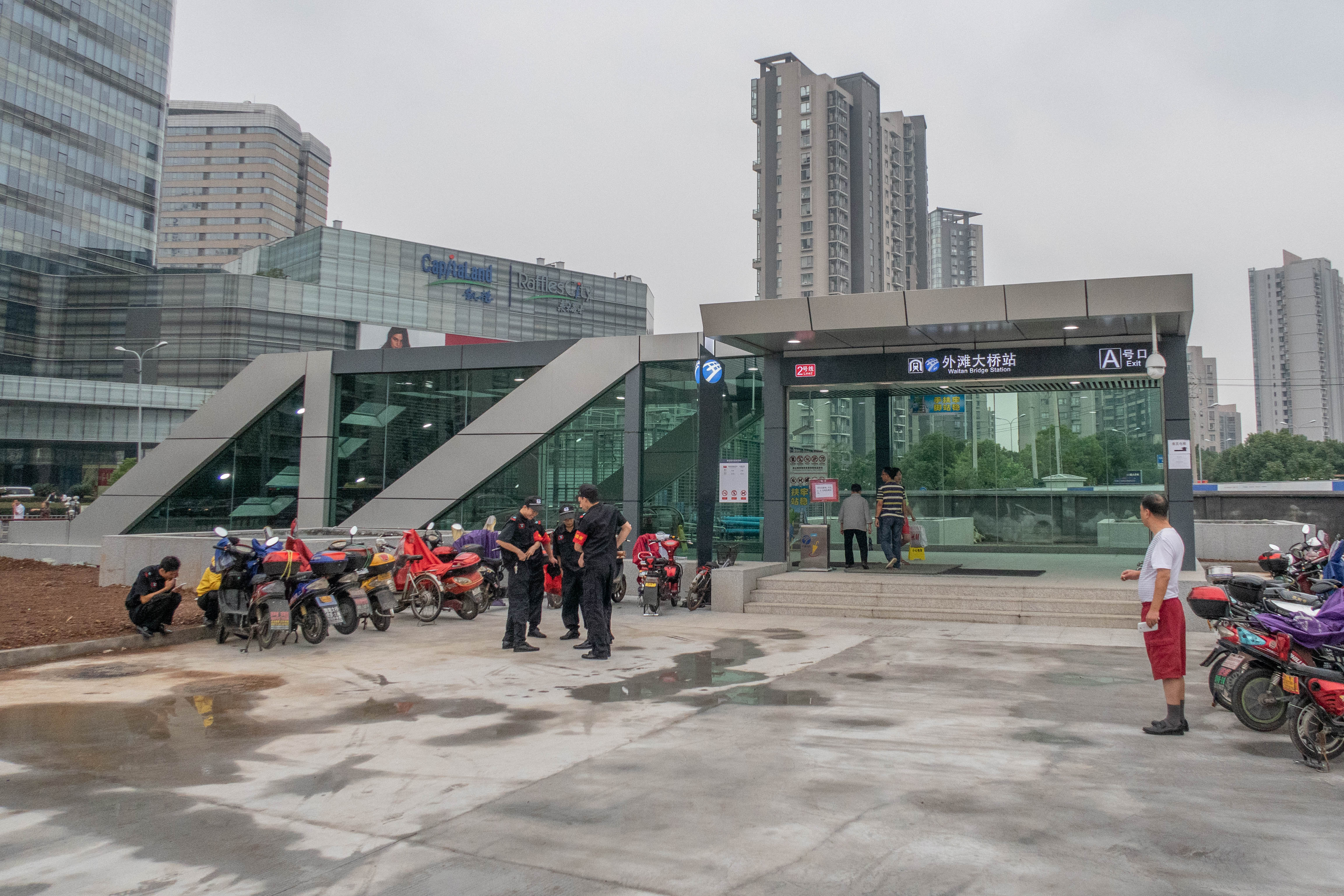
Exit A, Waitan Bridge Station

Waitan Bridge Station has 5 exits.

Exit	Suggested destinations
A	Dazha South Road
B	Jiefang North Road, Raffles Square
C	Daqing South Road, Shijun Street, Jiangbei Park
D	Daqing South Road, Jiangbei Central Primary School
E	Dazha South Road, Xinyi Road
