= Chenghuangmiao station =

Ningbo Metro station

Coordinates: 29.8672°N 121.5491°E

Chenghuangmiao 城隍庙
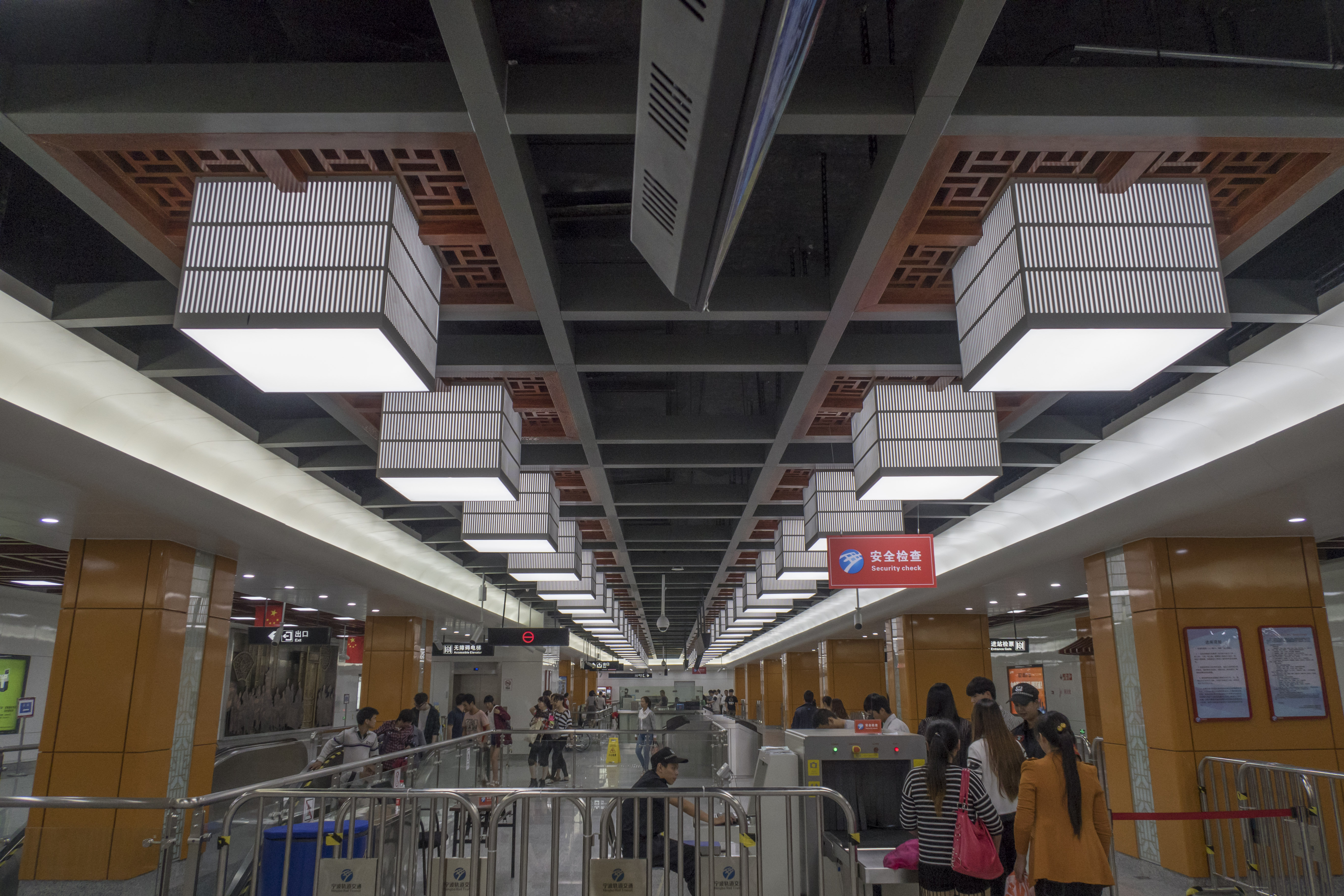

General information
- Location: Haishu District, Ningbo, Zhejiang; China
- Operated by: Ningbo Rail Transit Co. Ltd.
- Line(s): Line 2
- Platforms: 2 (1 island platform)

Construction
- Structure type: Underground

History
- Opened: September 26, 2015

Services
Preceding station	Ningbo Rail Transit	Following station
Ningbo Railway Station towards Lishe International Airport	Line 2	Gulou towards Honglian

Chenghuangmiao station (Chinese: 城隍庙站; lit. 'City God Temple station'), is an underground metro station in Ningbo, Zhejiang, China. The station is situated on the west of City God Temple of Ningbo. Construction of the station started in December 2010 and the station opened to service on September 26, 2015.

== Exits ==
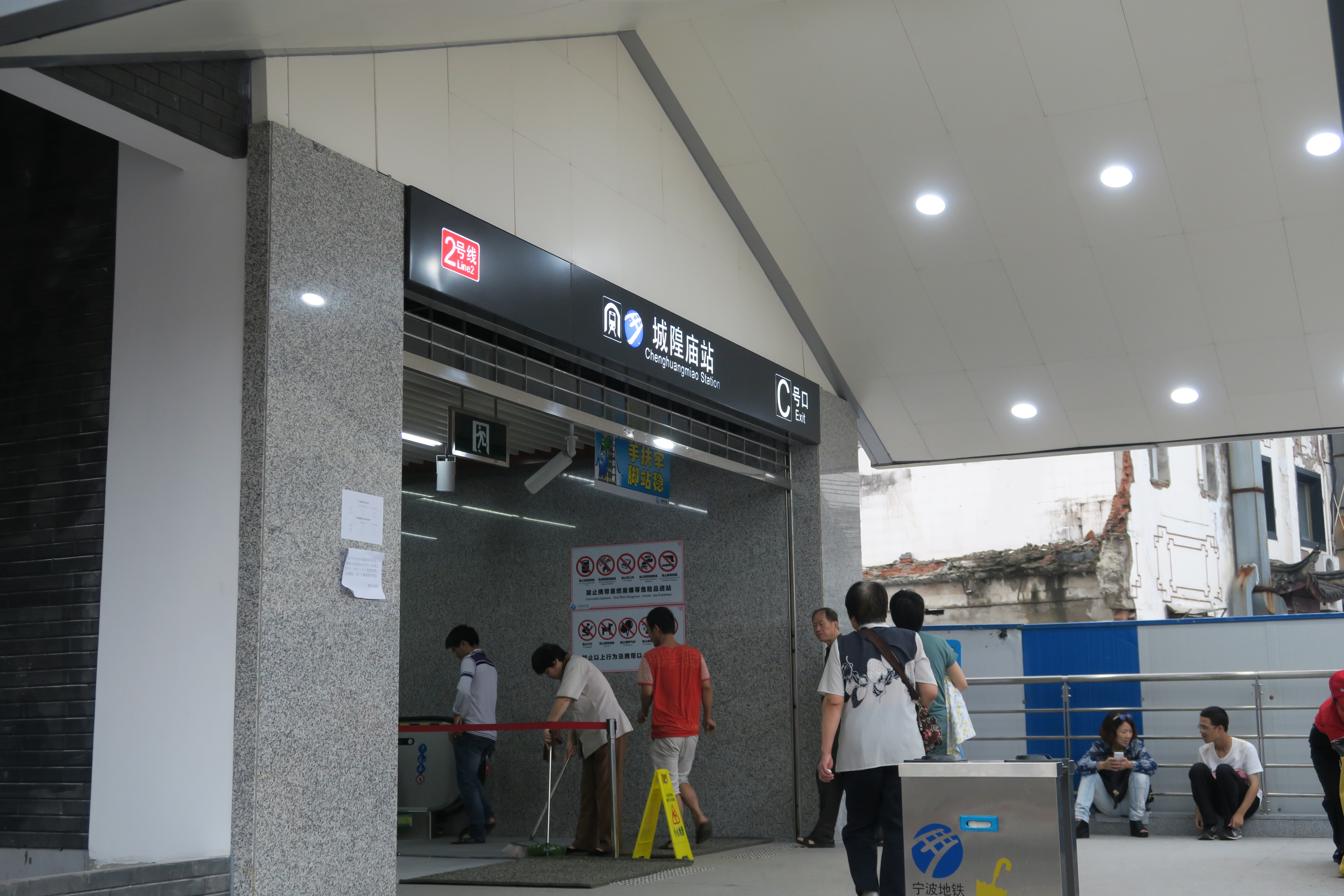
Exit C, Chenghuangmiao Station

Chenghuangmiao Station has 2 exits.

Exit number	Suggested destinations
C	Xianxue Street, Tianfeng Tower
D	Yaohang Street, Chenghuangmiao Shopping Mall
