= Lishe station =

Ningbo Metro station

Coordinates: 29.8094°N 121.4833°E

Lishe 栎社
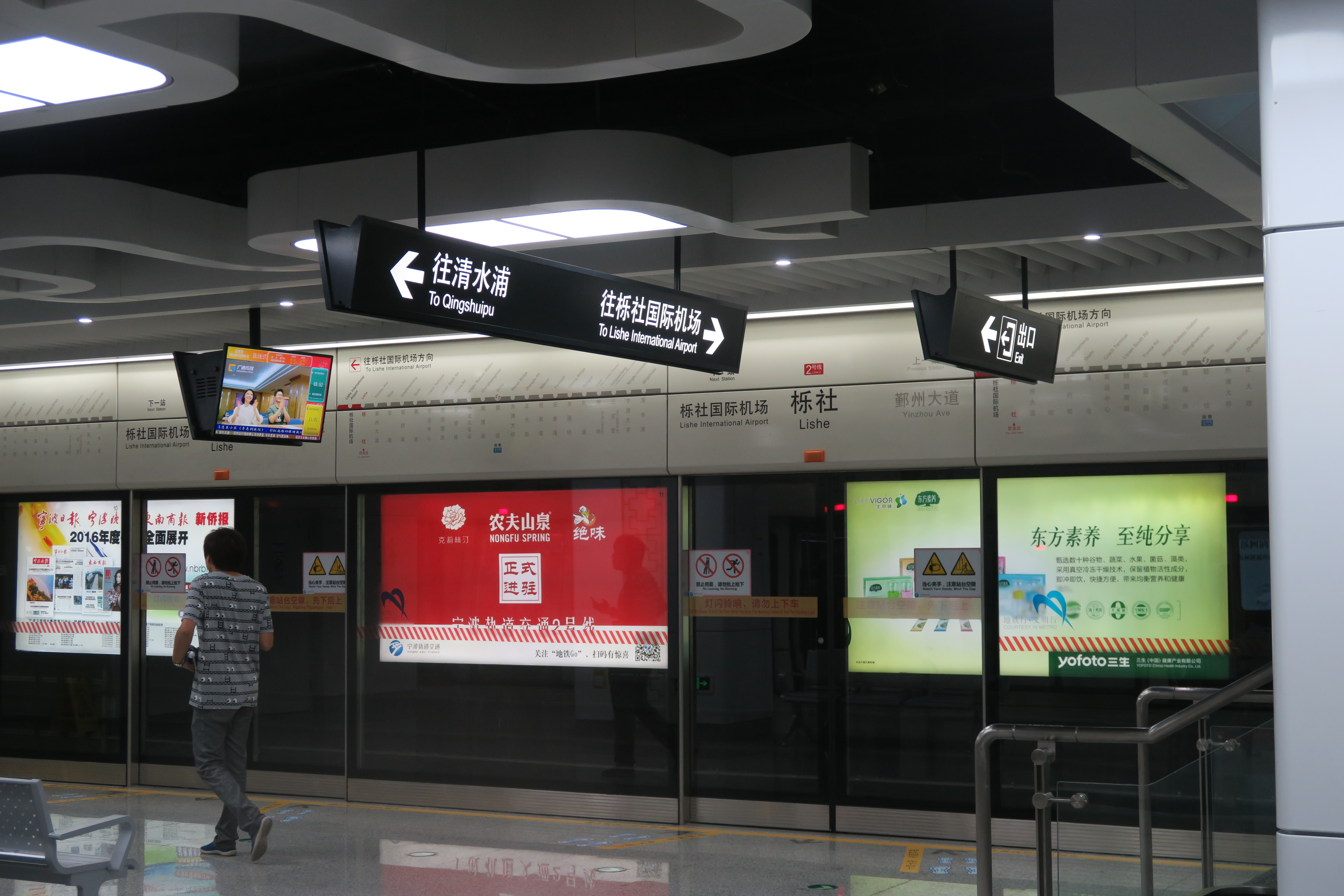

General information
- Location: Haishu District, Ningbo, Zhejiang; China
- Operator: Ningbo Rail Transit Co. Ltd.
- Line: Line 2
- Platforms: 2 (1 island platform)

Construction
- Structure type: Underground

History
- Opened: September 26, 2015

Services
Preceding station	Ningbo Rail Transit	Following station
Lishe International Airport Terminus	Line 2	Yinzhou Avenue towards Honglian
Location

Lishe Station is an underground metro station in Ningbo, Zhejiang, China. It situates on Airport Road. Construction of the station starts in December 2010 and opened to service in September 26, 2015.

== Exits ==
Lishe Station has 2 exits.

No	Suggested destinations
A	Lishe Village Committee
B	Airport Road
