= Sanguantang station (Ningbo Rail Transit) =

Metro station in Ningbo, China

Coordinates: 29.9119°N 121.6213°E

Sanguantang 三官堂
- Exterior

General information
- Location: Jiangbei District, Ningbo, Zhejiang; China
- Operator: Ningbo Rail Transit Co. Ltd.
- Lines: Line 2 Line 5
- Platforms: 4 (2 side platforms, 1 island platform)

Construction
- Structure type: Elevated (Line 2); Underground (Line 5)

History
- Opened: 26 September 2015

Services
Preceding station	Ningbo Rail Transit	Following station
Lulin towards Lishe International Airport	Line 2	Ningbo University towards Honglian
Angmenggang towards Buzheng	Line 5	Xingzhuang Road towards Luotuo Bridge
Location

Sanguantang Station is an interchange station between Line 2 and Line 5 in Ningbo, Zhejiang, China. It situates at the crossing of Ningzhen Road and Minghai Avenue. The station of Line 2 is elevated while the station for Line 5 is underground. Construction of station of Line 2 started in middle 2012 and opened to service on September 26, 2015. The Line 5 platforms opened to service on December 28, 2021.

== Exits ==
Sanguantang Station has 5 exits.

No	Suggested destinations
A	Zhejiang Textile & Fashion College
B	Minghai South Road

== Gallery ==
Line 2 concourse

Line 5 concourse

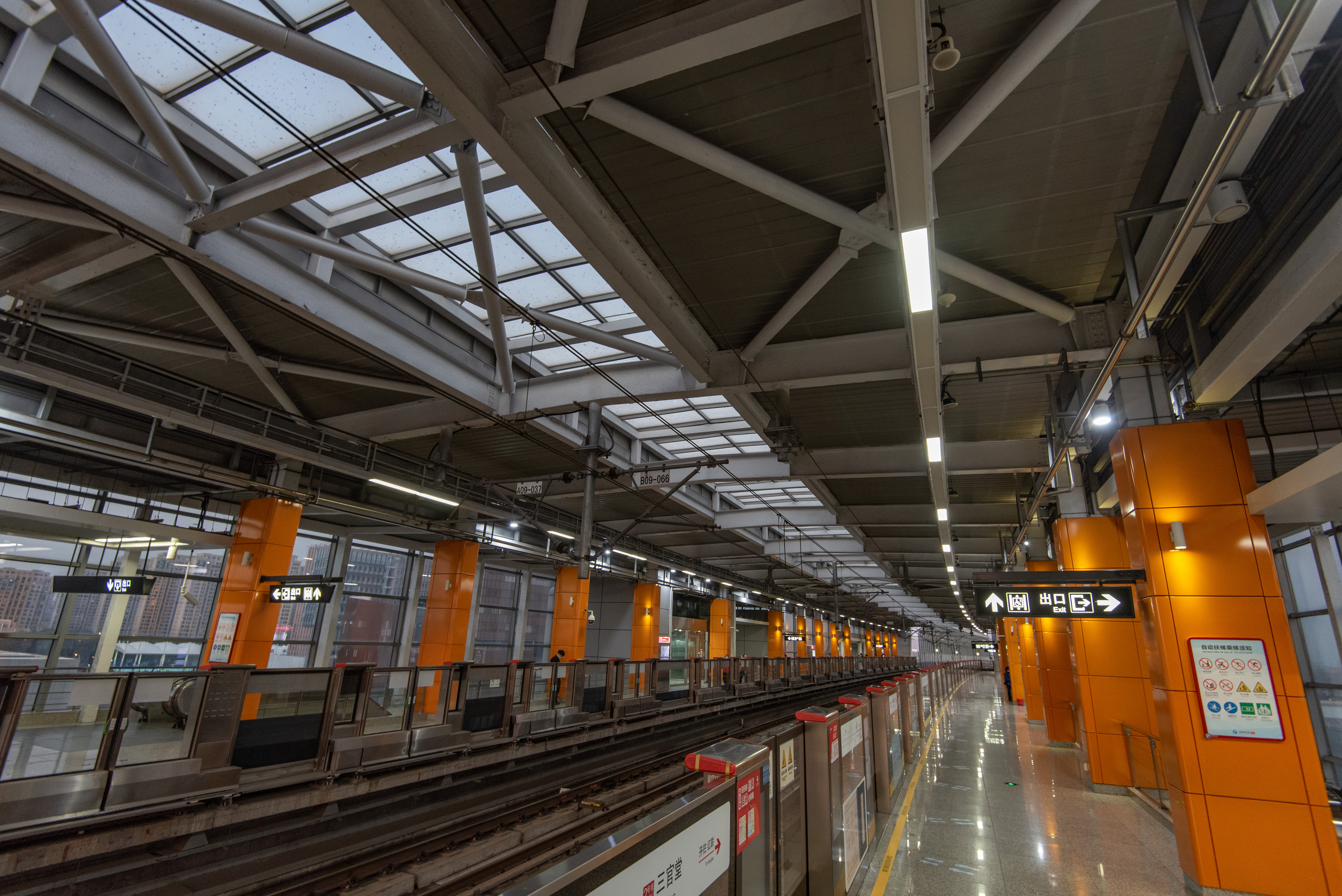
Line 2 platform

Line 5 platform
