= Shiqi station (Ningbo Rail Transit) =

Metro station in Ningbo, China

Coordinates: 29.8255°N 121.5035°E

Shiqi 石碶
- Line 2 platform

General information
- Location: Haishu District, Ningbo, Zhejiang; China
- Operator: Ningbo Rail Transit Co. Ltd.
- Lines: Line 2; Line 5
- Platforms: 4 (2 island platform)

Construction
- Structure type: Underground

History
- Opened: 26 September 2015

Services
Preceding station	Ningbo Rail Transit	Following station
Yinzhou Avenue towards Lishe International Airport	Line 2	Qingfangcheng towards Honglian
Tongde Road towards Buzheng	Line 5	Yadu towards Luotuo Bridge
Location

Shiqi Station is an underground metro station of Line 2 and Line 5 in Ningbo, Zhejiang, China. It situates on the crossing of Yinxian Avenue and Yongor Avenue. Construction of the station starts in late 2010 and opened to service in September 26, 2015. In the construction plan of Ningbo Rail Transit, Shiqi Station will be a transfer station between Line 2 and Line 5.

== Exits ==
Shiqi Station has 2 exits.

Exit No.	Nearby attractions
A	Shiqi Bridge, Rose Square
C	Yongor Avenue
