= Sanguantang station =

Sanguantang station may refer to:

- Sanguantang station (Ningbo Rail Transit), in Ningbo, Zhejiang Province, China
- Sanguantang station (Chengdu Metro), in Chengdu, Sichuan Province, China
