= Shiqi Station =

Shiqi Station may refer to:

- Shiqi Station (Guangzhou), on Line 4, Guangzhou Metro, China
- Shiqi Station (Ningbo), on Line 2 and Line 5, Ningbo Rail Transit, China
