= Qingshuipu station =

Ningbo Metro station

Qingshuipu 清水浦
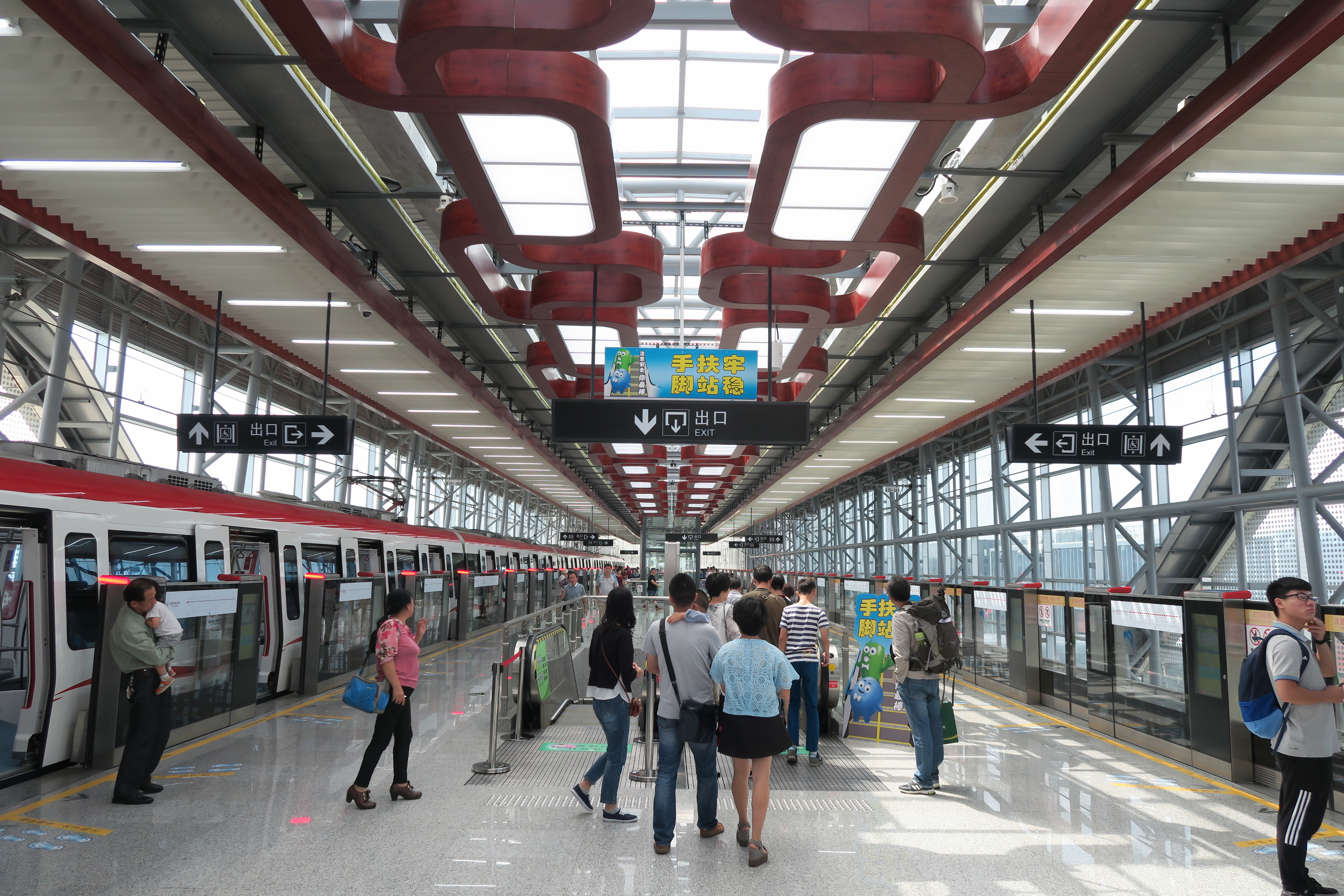

General information
- Location: Zhenhai District, Ningbo, Zhejiang; China
- Coordinates: 29.924272°N 121.656697°E
- Operator: Ningbo Rail Transit Co. Ltd.
- Line: Line 2
- Platforms: 2 (1 island platform)

Construction
- Structure type: Elevated

History
- Opened: September 26, 2015

Services
Preceding station	Ningbo Rail Transit	Following station
Ningbo University towards Lishe International Airport	Line 2	Wulipai towards Honglian
Location
- Location within Zhejiang Location within China

Qingshuipu Station is an elevated metro station in Ningbo, Zhejiang, China. Qingshuipu Station is a station of Line 2 of Ningbo Rail Transit. It situates on Ningzhen Road. Construction of the station started in middle 2012 and opened to service in September 26, 2015.

== Exits ==
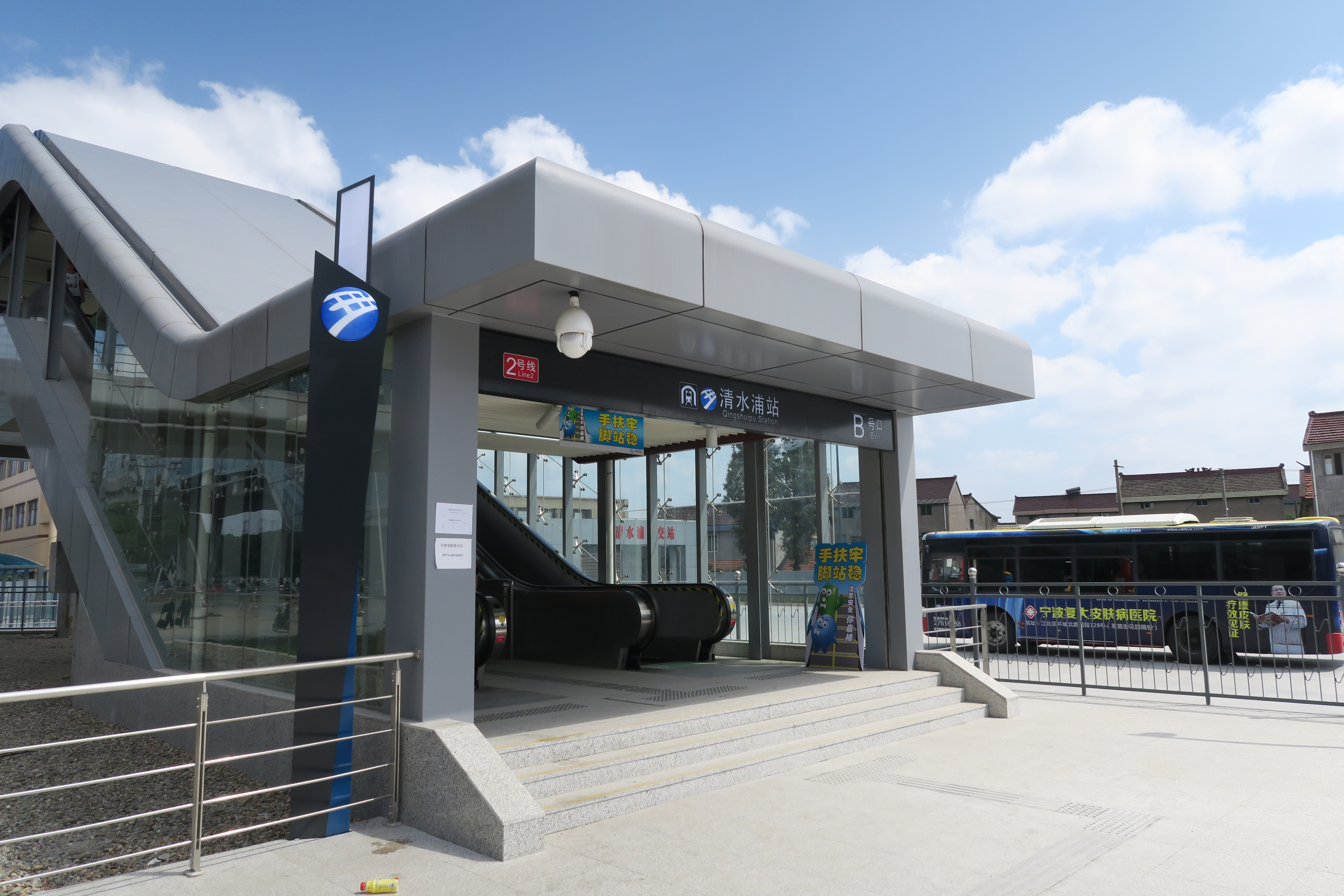
Exit B, Qingshuipu Station

Qingshuipu Station has 2 exits.

No	Suggested destinations
A	Jinchuan Road, Ningbo Nordic Industry Park
B	West Zhenning Road
