= Line 6 (Ningbo Rail Transit) =

Metro line in Ningbo, Zhejiang

Overview
- Status: Operational
- Owner: Ningbo Rail Transit Group Co.Ltd
- Locale: Ningbo, Zhejiang, China
- Termini: Gulin; Honglian
- Stations: 23

Service
- Type: Rapid transit
- System: Ningbo Rail Transit
- Operator: Ningbo Rail Transit Group Co.Ltd
- Depot(s): Gaoqiao South Depot, Xinmian Parking Lot
- Rolling stock: 37 Six cars type B train

History
- Opened: 16 January 2026; 9 months ago

Technical
- Line length: 39.6 km (24.6 mi)
- Number of tracks: 2
- Track gauge: 1,435 mm (4 ft 8 1/2 in)
- Electrification: 1,500 V DC Overhead catenary
- Operating speed: 100 km/h (62 mph) (Maximum design speed)
Route map

The Line 6 of Ningbo Rail Transit (Chinese: 宁波轨道交通6号线) is a rapid transit line in Ningbo, Zhejiang. It starts from Gulin to Honglian with 23 stations in operation, spanning 39.6 km long. Construction started on 28 December 2022 with a total investment of 31.53 billion RMB.

== Opening timeline ==
Segment	Commencement	Length	Station(s)	Name
Gulin — Honglian	16 January 2026	39.6 km (24.61 mi)	23	Phase 1

== Stations ==
All 23 stations are underground.

The intervals is 6 minutes during peak hours, 8 minutes during off peak hours and 10 minutes in normal hours.

When Line 6 started its operation, due to the passageway directly connecting 2 lines at Zhengda Road and Cuibaili not being opened, transfer outside the station area is required. If using following QR code channels, Ningbo Rail Transit App, WeChat Pay, Alipay, passengers must transfer within 30 minutes once they exit from one of the 2 stations. For passengers using single journey tickets or other IC cards, a "Ride Ticket" can be received when swiping their cards to leave the gate, and continue to the next trip with the "Ticket". On 1 June 2026, the transfer passageway of Zhengda Road was opened for service.

- OSI: Out of System Interchange

Station name		Transfer	Service pattern		Distance km		Location
English	Chinese	Transfer	Local	Express (Future)	Distance km		Location
Gulin	古林		●	●	0.00	0.00	Haishu
Yunlin West Road	云林西路		●	-			Haishu
Jishigang	集士港		●	-			Haishu
Huishi Road	汇士路		●	-			Haishu
Maimianqiao	卖面桥		●	-			Haishu
Songjiacao	宋家漕		●	-			Haishu
Wangchun Bridge	望春桥	1	●	●			Haishu
Ningbo Traditional Chinese Medicine Hospital	市中医院	8	●	●			Haishu
Cuibaili	翠柏里	4 (currently OSI)	●	●			Haishu
Xinzhi Road	新芝路		●	-			Haishu
Ningbo Grand Theater	宁波大剧院	7	●	●			Jiangbei
Zhengda Road	正大路	2	●	●			Jiangbei
Qingfeng Bridge East	庆丰桥东		●	-			Yinzhou
Minglou	明楼	3	●	●			Yinzhou
Mingzhu Road	明珠路		●	-			Yinzhou
Canghai North Road	沧海北路		●	-			Yinzhou
Yuanshi Road	院士路	5	●	-			Yinzhou
Juxian Road	聚贤路		●	-			Yinzhou
Meixu	梅墟		●	-			Yinzhou
Xieshu	谢墅		●	-			Beilun
Xiaogang West	小港西		●	-			Beilun
Yaqian	衙前		●	-			Beilun
Honglian	红联	2	●	●		39.60	Beilun

== Commemorative products ==
To celebrate Line 6 opening on 16 January 2026, Ningbo Rail Transit sold limited-edition commemorative tickets. Each person can only buy 2 sets, with each set consisting of 2 commemorative tickets, per day. Each ticket has only 15 rides total. In parallel with sold commemorative ticket sets, Ningbo Rail Transit also sold building blocks which look similar to the appearance of the Line 6 train. The building blocks are divided into 2 sets: Mini train and Small train.
