= Line 2 (Ningbo Rail Transit) =

Metro line in Ningbo, China

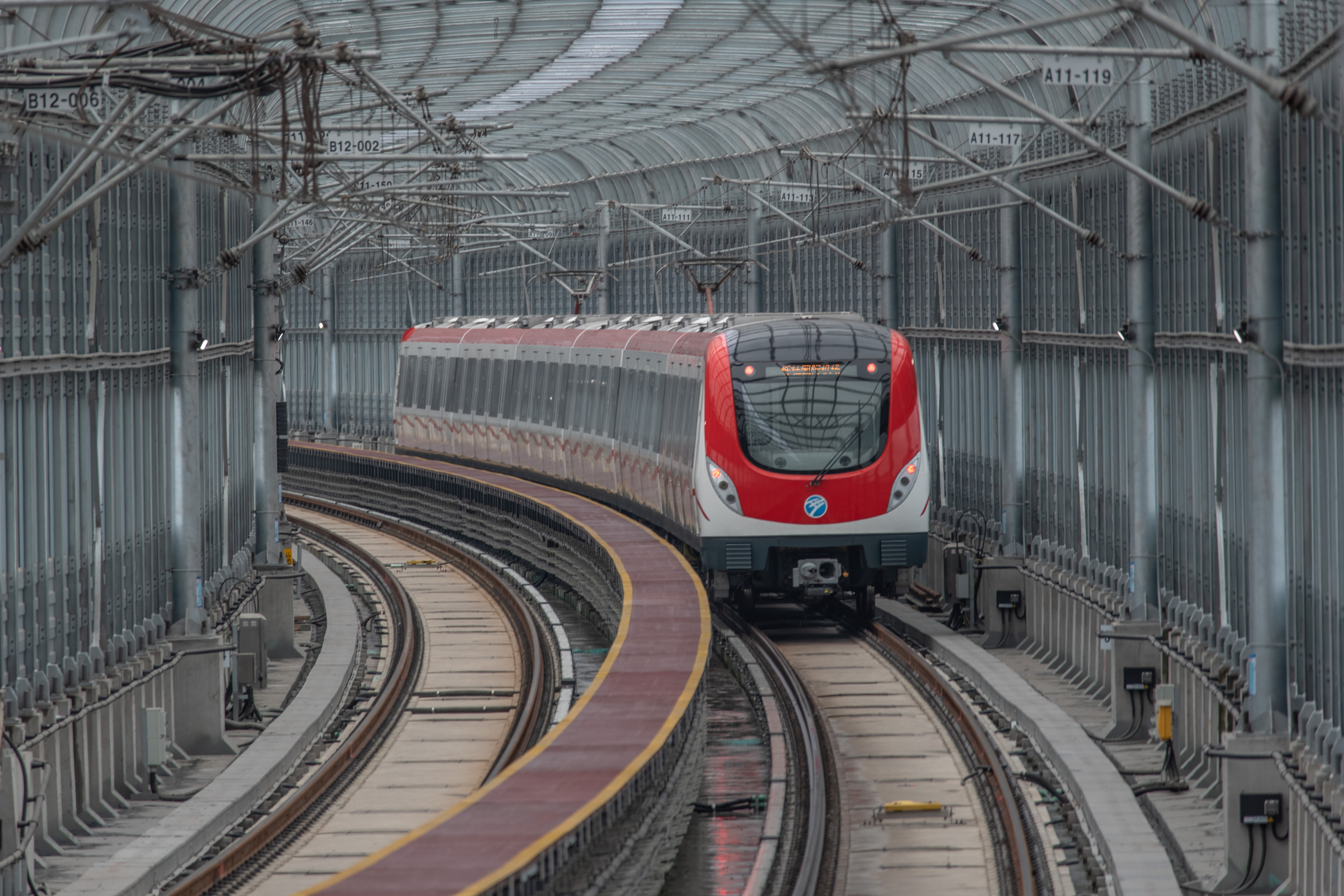
- Line 2 train

Overview
- Status: Operational
- Owner: Ningbo
- Locale: Ningbo, Zhejiang, China
- Termini: Lishe International Airport; Honglian
- Stations: 27

Service
- Type: Rapid transit, Airport rail link
- System: Ningbo Rail Transit
- Operator(s): Ningbo Rail Transit Co., Ltd.

History
- Opened: 26 September 2015; 10 years ago

Technical
- Line length: 36.85 km (22.90 mi)
- Number of tracks: 2
- Character: Underground and elevated
- Track gauge: 1,435 mm (4 ft 8 1/2 in)
- Electrification: Overhead catenary with 1,500 V DC
Route map

Line 2 of Ningbo Rail Transit (Chinese: 宁波轨道交通2号线) is a rapid transit line in Ningbo. It stretches from Ningbo Lishe International Airport in the southwest towards Zhenhai District in the northeast of the city and further run into Honglian station in Beilun District. The line started service on 26 September 2015.

== Route ==
Line 2 is the second metro line in Ningbo. It starts near Ningbo Lishe International Airport and stretches eastwards as tunnels. After reaching Yage'er Avenue it turns northwards and passes Ningbo Textile City following which the route zigzags into Ningbo Coach Terminal and then goes eastwards while crosses Ningbo railway station, the main railway station of the city. Then the route extends northwards into Jiangbei District and turn eastwards until it reaches Lulin Market, where it turns into viaducts before reaching Zhenhai District. The line will go further into Honglian in the second phase of construction. Wulipai, Fengyuan and Congyuan Road stations opened on 30 May 2020. Zhaobaoshan and Honglian stations opened on 1 December 2022.

== Opening timeline ==
| Segment | Commencement | Length | Station(s) | Name |
|---|---|---|---|---|
| Lishe International Airport — Qingshuipu | 26 September 2015 | 28.35 km (17.62 mi) | 22 | Phase 1 |
| Qingshuipu — Congyuan Road | 30 May 2020 | 5.6 km (3.48 mi) | 3 | Phase 2 |
| Congyuan Road — Honglian | 1 December 2022 | 2.9 km (1.80 mi) | 2 | Phase 2 |

== Stations ==
- OSI: Out of System Interchange

| Station name | | Connections | Distance km | | Location |
| English | Chinese | Connections | Distance km | | Location |
|---|---|---|---|---|---|
| Lishe International Airport | 栎社国际机场 | NGB | 0.00 | 0.00 | Haishu |
| Lishe | 栎社 | | 2.51 | 2.51 | Haishu |
| Yinzhou Avenue | 鄞州大道 | | 1.75 | 4.26 | Haishu |
| Shiqi | 石碶 | 5 | 1.13 | 5.39 | Haishu |
| Qingfangcheng | 轻纺城 | | 1.21 | 6.60 | Haishu |
| Ouchi | 藕池 | | 1.42 | 8.02 | Haishu |
| Coach Terminal | 客运中心 | | 1.24 | 9.26 | Haishu |
| Liyuan South Road | 丽园南路 | 8 | 1.13 | 10.39 | Haishu |
| Yunxia Road | 云霞路 | | 0.87 | 11.26 | Haishu |
| Ningbo Railway Station | 宁波火车站 | 4 NGH ( Yongyu ) | 1.16 | 12.42 | Haishu |
| Chenghuangmiao | 城隍庙 | | 1.46 | 13.88 | Haishu |
| Gulou | 鼓楼 | 1 | 0.72 | 14.60 | Haishu |
| Waitan Bridge | 外滩大桥 | 7 | 1.46 | 16.06 | Jiangbei |
| Zhengda Road | 正大路 | 6 | 0.83 | 16.89 | Jiangbei |
| Nijiayan | 倪家堰 | | 1.10 | 17.99 | Jiangbei |
| Yasaiyan | 压赛堰 | | 1.17 | 19.16 | Jiangbei |
| Datong Bridge | 大通桥 | 3 | 0.65 | 19.81 | Jiangbei |
| Kongpu | 孔浦 | Ningci | 1.06 | 20.87 | Jiangbei |
| Lulin | 路林 | | 2.07 | 22.94 | Jiangbei |
| Sanguantang | 三官堂 | 5 | 0.87 | 23.81 | Jiangbei |
| Ningbo University | 宁波大学 | | 1.31 | 25.12 | Jiangbei |
| Qingshuipu | 清水浦 | | 2.83 | 27.95 | Zhenhai |
| Wulipai | 五里牌 | | 1.98 | 29.93 | Zhenhai |
| Fengyuan | 枫园 | | 2.04 | 31.97 | Zhenhai |
| Congyuan Road | 聪园路 | | 1.71 | 33.68 | Zhenhai |
| Zhaobaoshan | 招宝山 | | 0.54 | 34.22 | Zhenhai |
| Honglian | 红联 | 6 | 1.58 | 35.80 | Beilun |
