= Lishe International Airport station =

Metro station in Ningbo, China

Coordinates: 29.8182°N 121.4603°E

Lishe International Airport 栎社国际机场
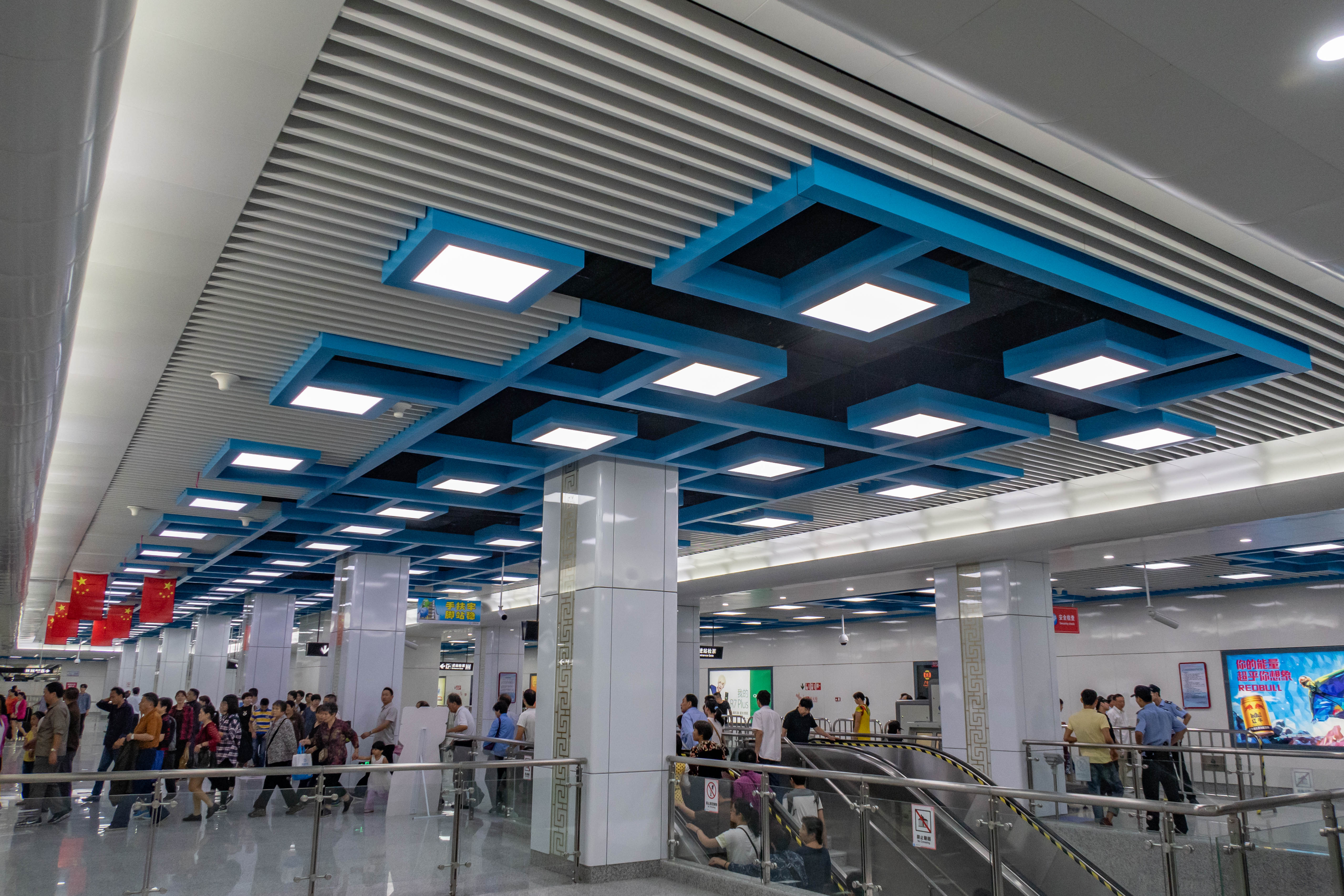

General information
- Location: Haishu District, Ningbo, Zhejiang; China
- Operated by: Ningbo Rail Transit Co. Ltd.
- Line(s): Line 2
- Platforms: 2 (1 island platform)

Construction
- Structure type: Underground

History
- Opened: September 26, 2015

Services
Preceding station	Ningbo Rail Transit	Following station
Terminus	Line 2	Lishe towards Honglian

Lishe International Airport Station is an underground metro station in Ningbo, Zhejiang, China. Lishe International Airport Station is a terminal station of Line 2, Ningbo Rail Transit. It situates on the south of planned Terminal 2 of Ningbo Lishe International Airport. Construction of the station starts in December 2010 and opened to service in September 26, 2015.

== Exits ==
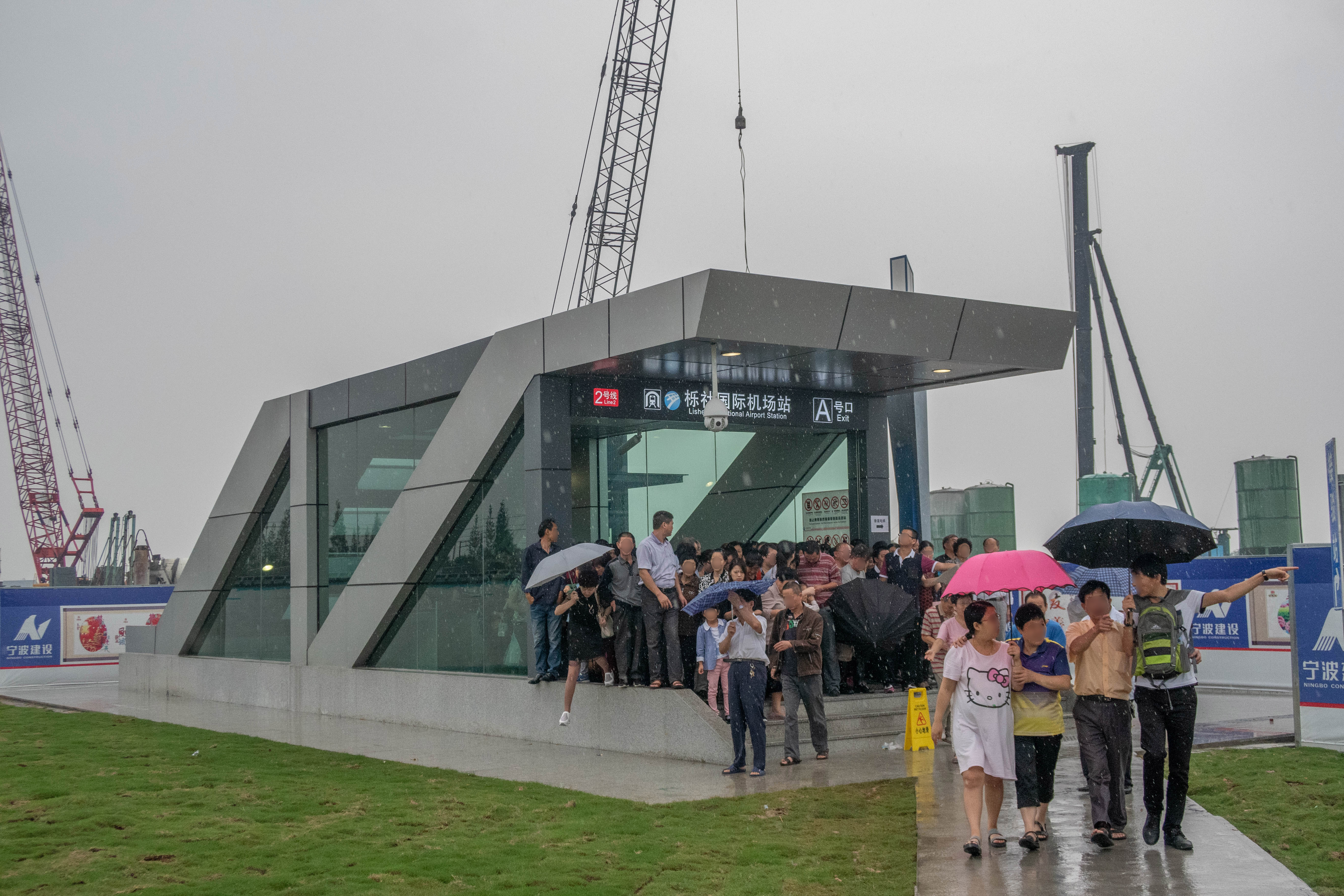
Exit A, Lishe International Airport Station

Lishe International Airport Station has 3 exits.

No	Suggested destinations
A	Ligao Road
B	Ligao Road, airport transfer bus station
C	Ligao Road
