= Honglian station =

Honglian may refer to:

- Honglian station (Chengdu Metro)
- Honglian station (Ningbo Rail Transit)
- Honglian Nanlu station
