= Daqi station =

Ningbo Metro station

Daqi 大碶
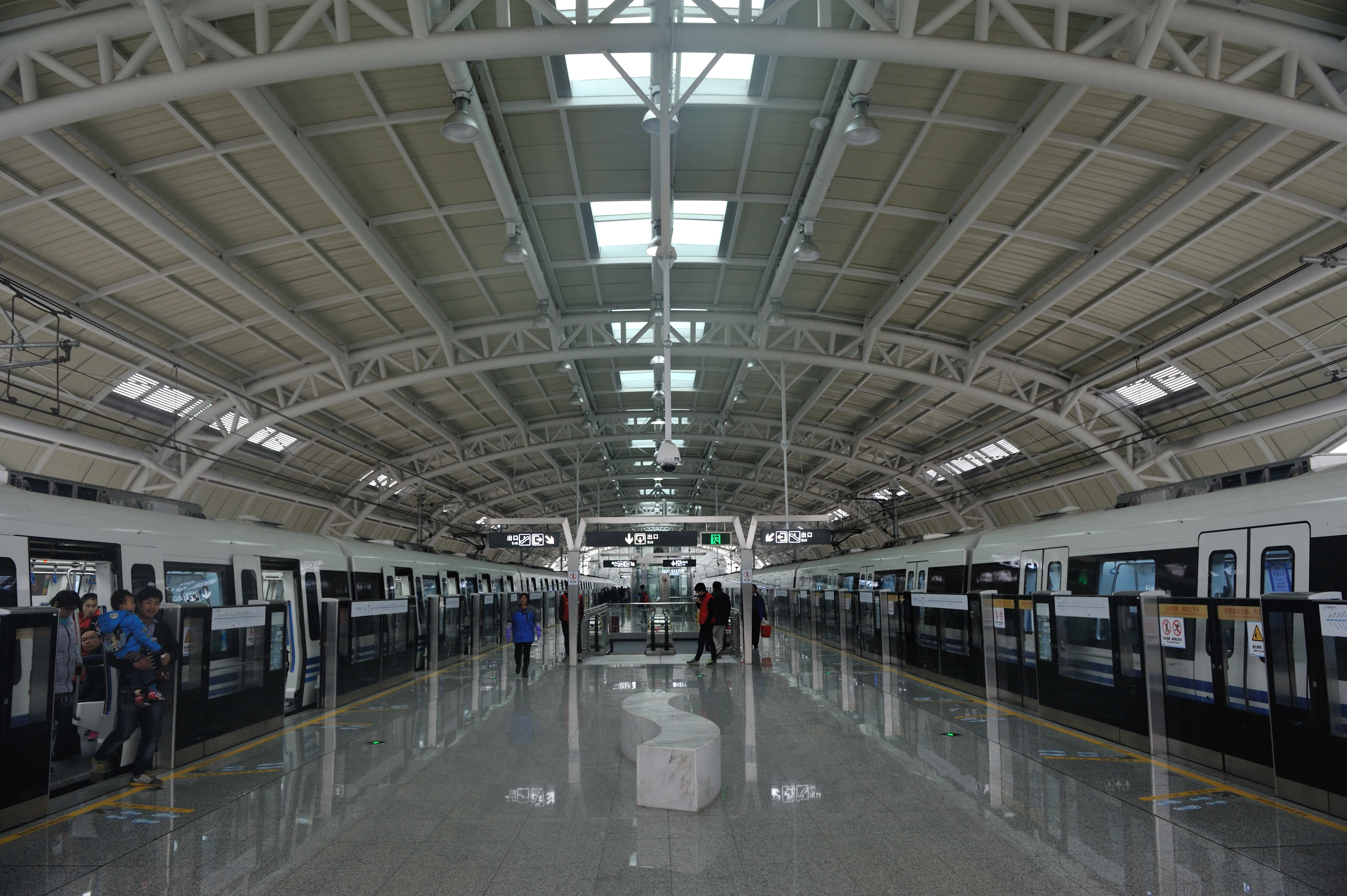

General information
- Location: Beilun District, Ningbo, Zhejiang; China
- Coordinates: 29.8959°N 121.7904°E
- Operated by: Ningbo Rail Transit Co. Ltd.
- Line(s): Line 1
- Platforms: 2 (1 island platform)

Construction
- Structure type: Elevated

History
- Opened: 19 March 2016

Services
Preceding station	Ningbo Rail Transit	Following station
Wuga towards Gaoqiao West	Line 1	Songhuajiang Road towards Xiapu

Daqi Station (Chinese: 大碶站; pinyin: Dàqì Zhàn) is an elevated metro station in Ningbo, Zhejiang, China. Daqi Station is situated in Daqi Subdistrict. Construction of the station started in December 2012 and it started service on March 19, 2016.

== Exits ==
Daqi Station has two exits:

No	Suggested destinations
A	Taishan West Road, Fubang Century Plaza
B	Taishan West Road
