= Zhoumeng North Road station =

Ningbo Metro station

Coordinates: 29.8698°N 121.5698°E

Zhoumeng North Road 舟孟北路
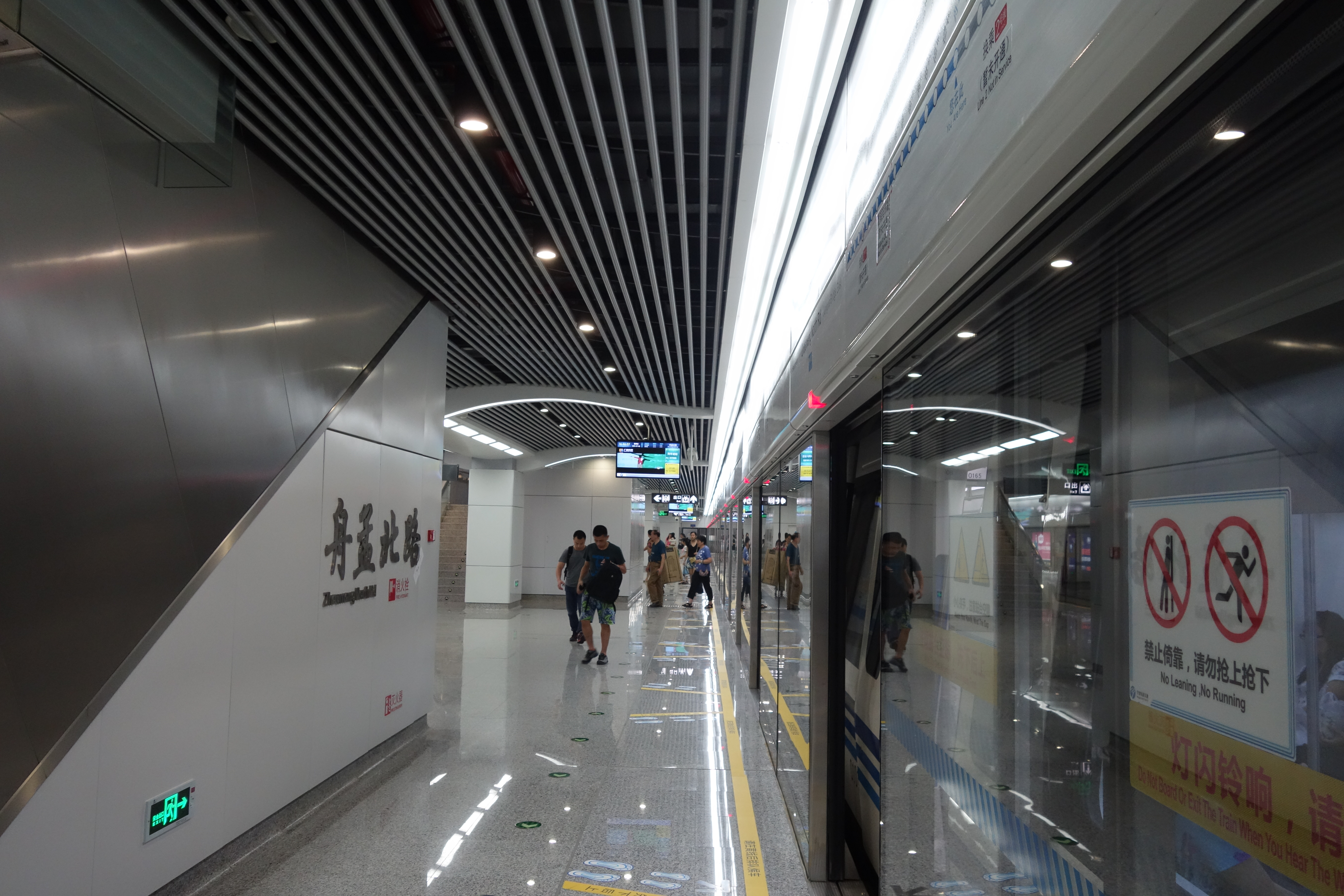

General information
- Location: Yinzhou District, Ningbo, Zhejiang; China
- Operated by: Ningbo Rail Transit Co. Ltd.
- Line: Line 1
- Platforms: 2 (1 island platform)

Construction
- Structure type: Underground

History
- Opened: 30 May 2014

Services
Preceding station	Ningbo Rail Transit	Following station
Jiangxia Bridge East towards Gaoqiao West	Line 1	Sakura Park towards Xiapu
Location

Zhoumeng North Road Station (Chinese: 舟孟北路站; pinyin: Zhōumèng Běilù Zhàn) is a metro station on Line 1 of the Ningbo Rail Transit that started operations on 30 May 2014. It is situated under Zhongshan East Road (Chinese: 中山东路) in Yinzhou District of Ningbo City, Zhejiang Province, eastern China.

== Exits ==
Exit number	Exit location
Exit A	Zhongshan East Road, Shangmao Street, Yonggang North Road
Exit B	Zhongshan East Road, Zhoumeng North Road, Yonggang North Road, Qianlong Community
