= Qiuga East station =

Metro station in Ningbo, China

Coordinates: 29.8471°N 121.6613°E

Qiuga East 邱隘东
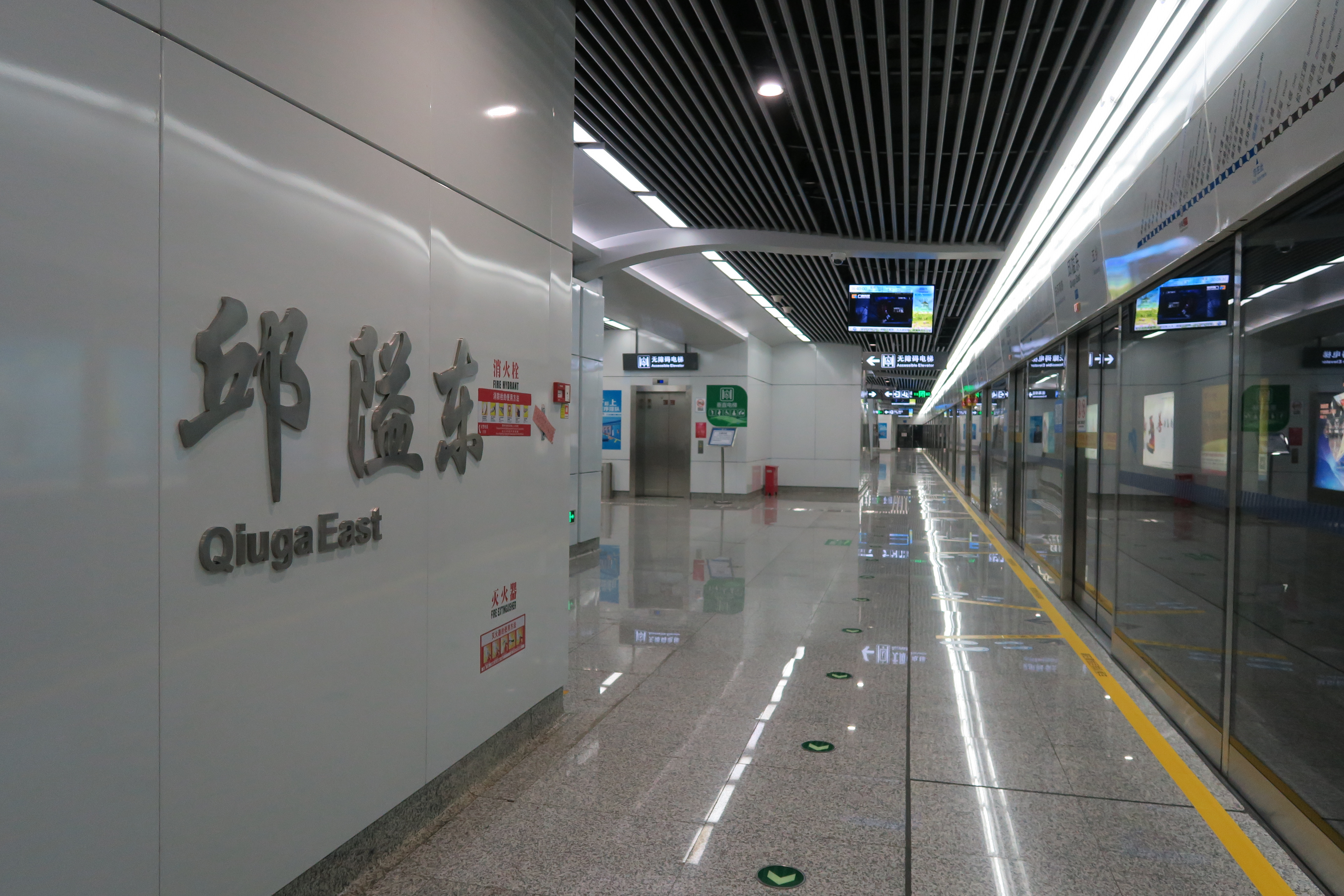
- Station platform before its graphical revamp in 2017

General information
- Location: Yinzhou District, Ningbo, Zhejiang; China
- Operator: Ningbo Rail Transit Co. Ltd.
- Line: Line 1
- Platforms: 2 (1 island platform)

Construction
- Structure type: Underground

History
- Opened: 19 March 2016

Services
Preceding station	Ningbo Rail Transit	Following station
Donghuan South Road towards Gaoqiao West	Line 1	Wuxiang towards Xiapu
Location

Qiuga East Station (simplified Chinese: 邱隘东站; traditional Chinese: 邱隘東站; pinyin: Qiūgà Dōng Zhàn) is an underground metro station in Ningbo. Qiuga East Station is located near the Tiantongzhuang Depot of Line 1, Ningbo Rail Transit. Construction of the station started in May 2012, and service began on March 19, 2016.

== Exits ==
Qiuga East Station has two exits.

No	Suggested destinations
A	Wuxiang West Road
B	Wuxiang West Road, Donghuan South Road
