= Wuxiang station =

Ningbo Metro station

Coordinates: 29.8409°N 121.6860°E

Wuxiang 五乡
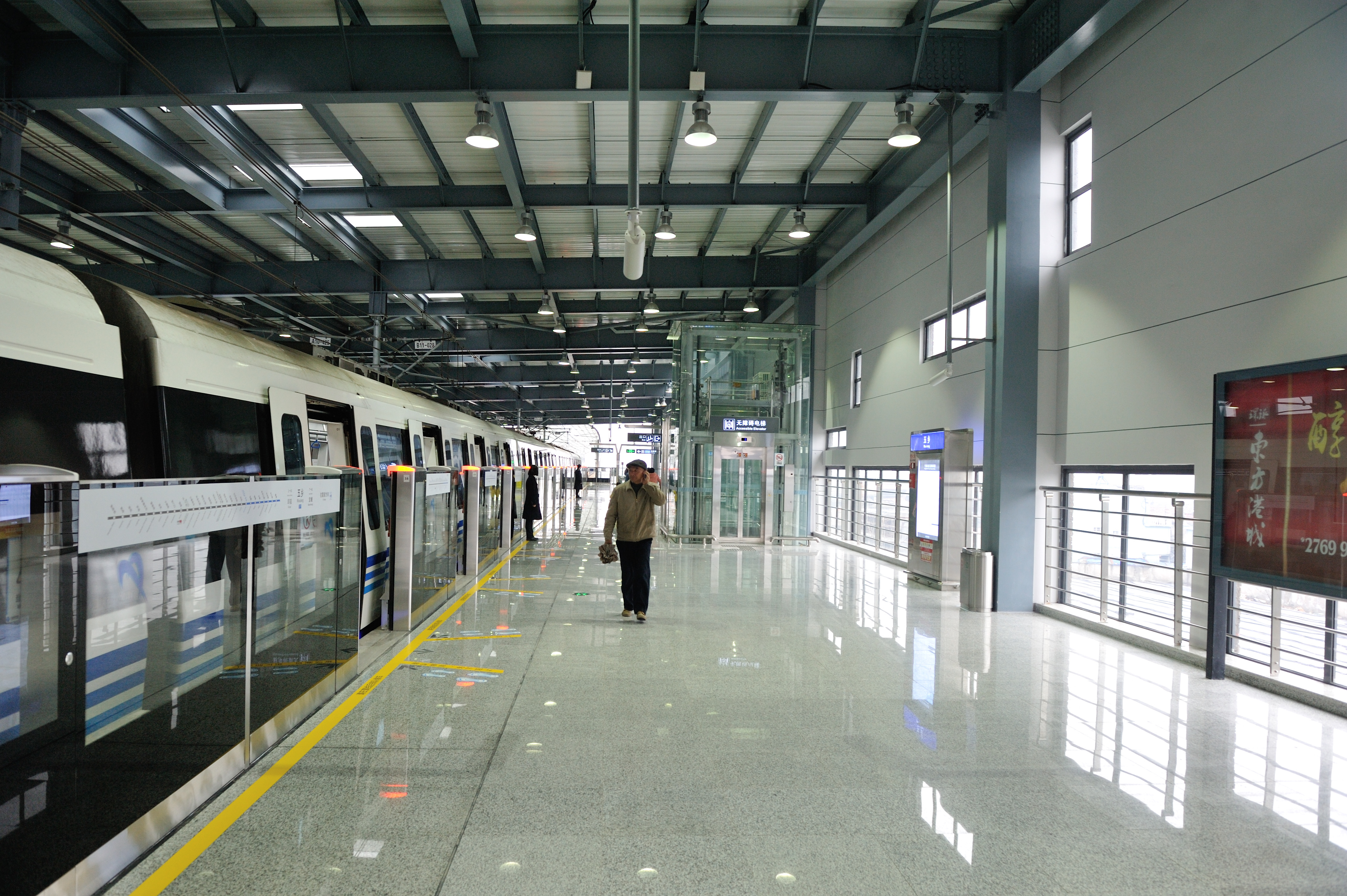

General information
- Location: Yinzhou District, Ningbo, Zhejiang; China
- Operated by: Ningbo Rail Transit Co. Ltd.
- Line(s): Line 1
- Platforms: 2 (2 side platforms)

Construction
- Structure type: Elevated

History
- Opened: 19 March 2016

Services
Preceding station	Ningbo Rail Transit	Following station
Qiuga East towards Gaoqiao West	Line 1	Baozhuang towards Xiapu

Wuxiang Station (simplified Chinese: 五乡站; traditional Chinese: 五鄉站; pinyin: Wǔxiāng Zhàn) is an elevated metro station in Ningbo, Zhejiang, China. Wuxiang Station situates near the crossing of Nantang River and Beilun Railway. Construction of the station started in December 2012, and the station entered into service on March 19, 2016.

== Exits ==
Wuxiang Station has two exits.

No	Suggested destinations
A	Shanhua Road
B	Shanhua Road
