= Daqing Bridge station =

Metro station in Ningbo, China

Coordinates: 29.8790°N 121.5280°E

Daqing Bridge 大卿桥
- Line 1 platform

General information
- Location: Haishu District, Ningbo, Zhejiang; China
- Operator: Ningbo Rail Transit Co. Ltd.
- Lines: Line 1 Line 4
- Platforms: 2 (1 island platform)

Construction
- Structure type: Underground

History
- Opened: 30 May 2014

Services
Preceding station	Ningbo Rail Transit	Following station
Zemin towards Gaoqiao West	Line 1	Ximenkou towards Xiapu
Cuibaili towards Cicheng West	Line 4	Liuxi towards International Conference Center
Location

Daqing Bridge Station (simplified Chinese: 大卿桥站; traditional Chinese: 大卿橋站; pinyin: Dàqīngqiáo Zhàn) is a station on Line 1 and Line 4 of the Ningbo Rail Transit that started operations on 30 May 2014. It is situated under Zhongshan West Road (Chinese: 中山西路) in Haishu District of Ningbo City, Zhejiang Province, eastern China.

== Exits ==
Exit number	Exit location
Exit A	Zhongshan West Road (north), Huachi Lane, Xiaoqiang Lane, Cuibai Road
Exit B	Zhongshan West Road (north), Yizi Lane, Cuibai Road
Exit C	Wan'an Road, Baiyang Street, Cangsong Road
