= Zhonghe Road station =

Train Station in Zhejian, China

Coordinates: 29.8962°N 121.8256°E

Zhonghe Road 中河路
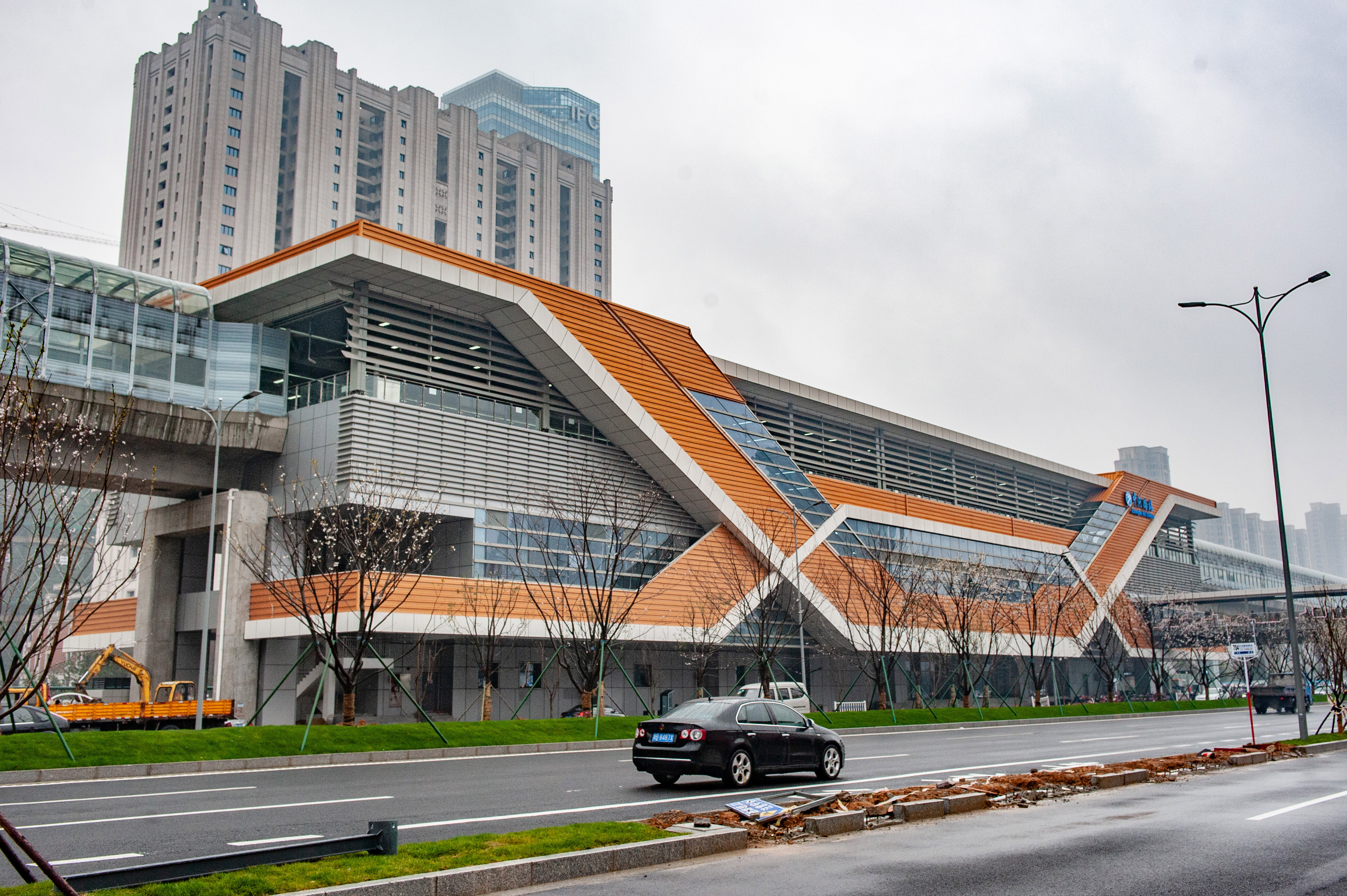

General information
- Location: Beilun District, Ningbo, Zhejiang; China
- Operated by: Ningbo Rail Transit Co. Ltd.
- Line: Line 1
- Platforms: 2 (2 side platforms)

Construction
- Structure type: Elevated

History
- Opened: 19 March 2016

Services
Preceding station	Ningbo Rail Transit	Following station
Songhuajiang Road towards Gaoqiao West	Line 1	Changjiang Road towards Xiapu
Location

Zhonghe Road Station (Chinese: 中河路站; pinyin: Zhōnghé Lù Zhàn is an elevated metro station in Ningbo, Zhejiang, China. Zhonghe Road Station situates in Xinqi Subdistrict near Taishan Road. Construction of the station starts in December 2012 and started service on March 19, 2016.

== Exits ==
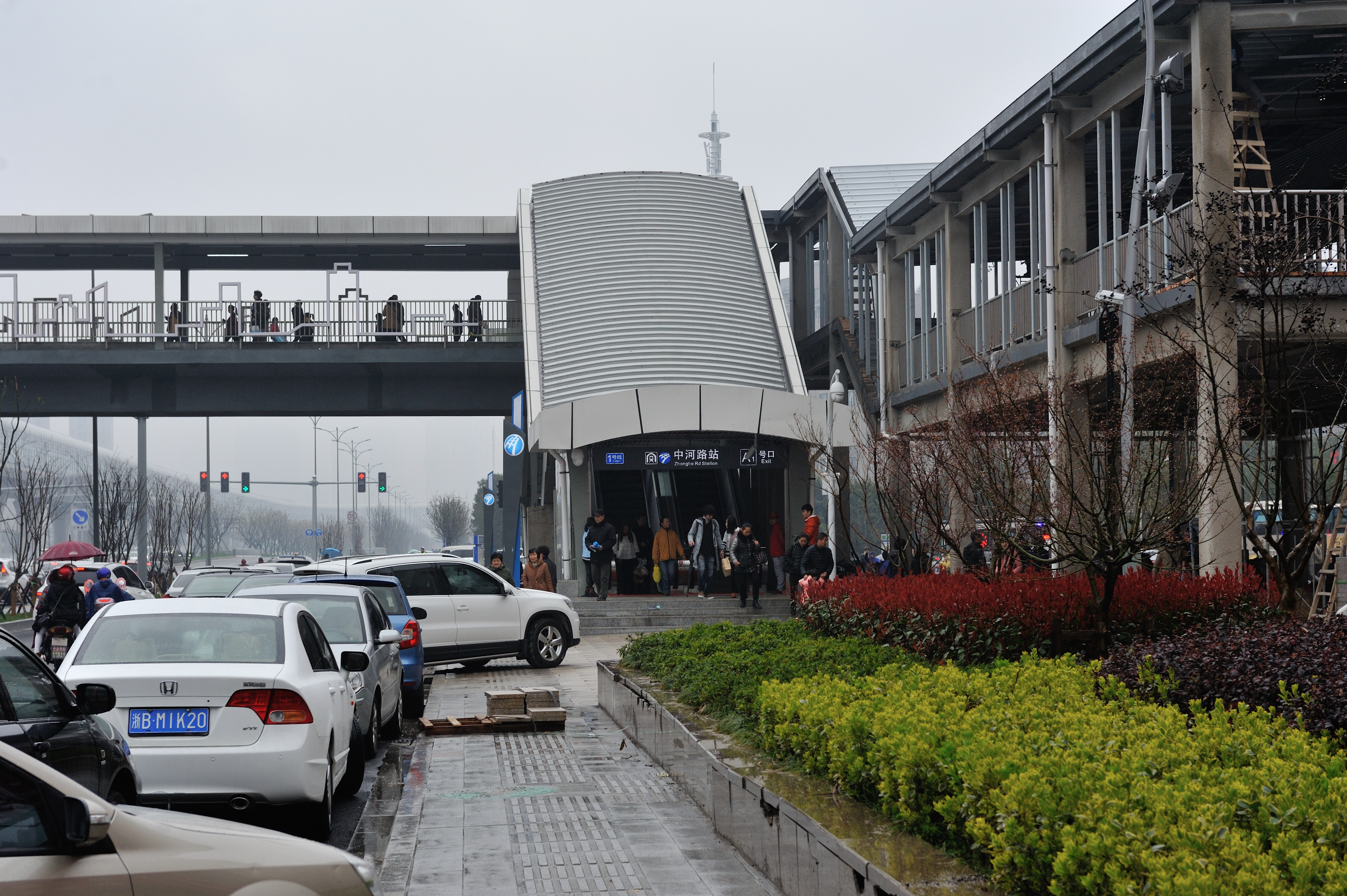
Exit A of Zhonghe Road Station

Zhonghe Road Station has two exits.

No	Suggested destinations
A	Taishan West Road, Zhonghe Road, Beilun Intime City
B	Taishan West Road, Zhonghe Road
