= Wuga station =

Ningbo Metro station

Coordinates: 29.8750°N 121.7822°E

Wuga 邬隘
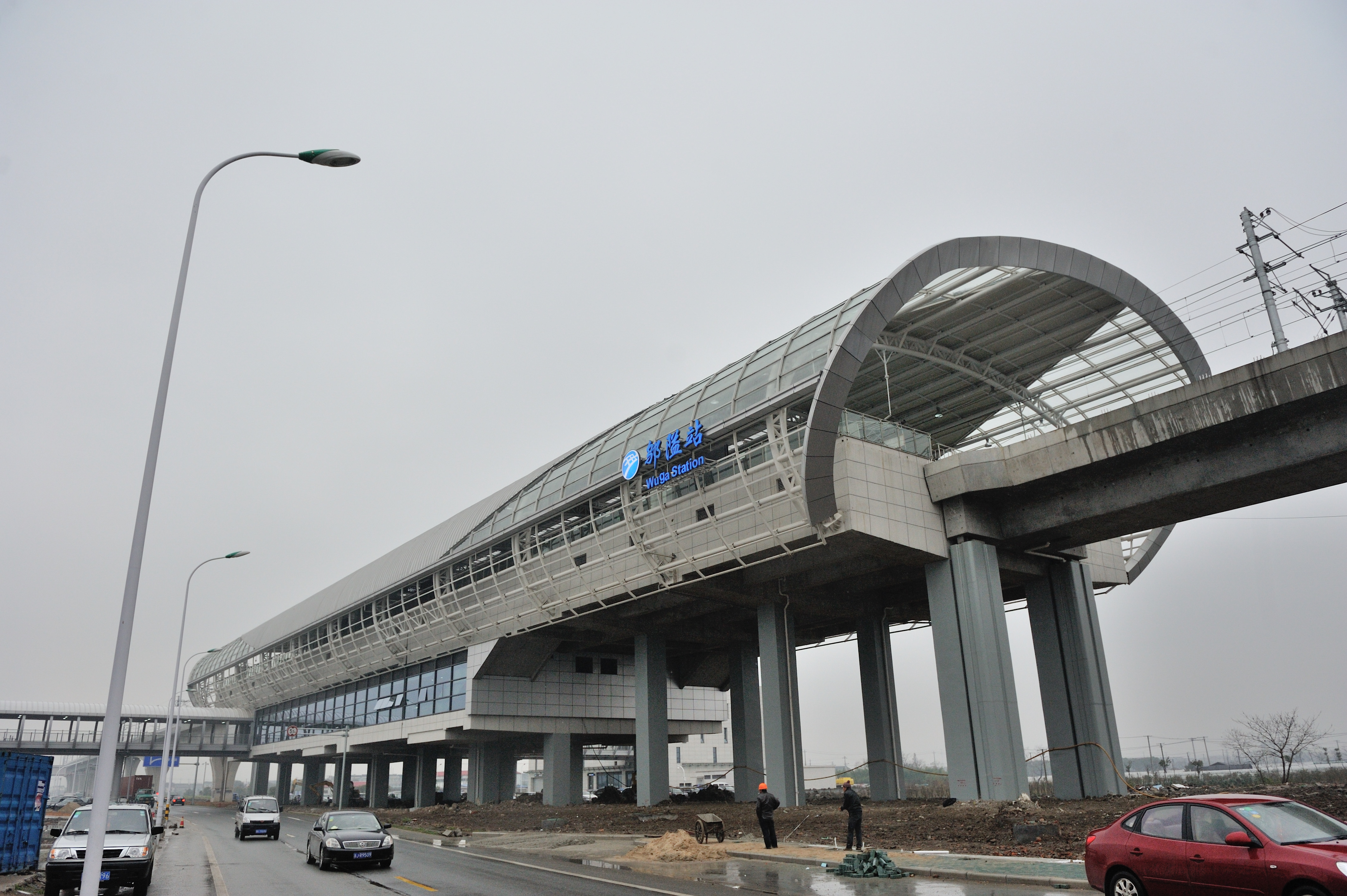

General information
- Location: Beilun District, Ningbo, Zhejiang; China
- Operated by: Ningbo Rail Transit Co. Ltd.
- Line(s): Line 1
- Platforms: 2 (2 side platforms)

Construction
- Structure type: Elevated

History
- Opened: 19 March 2016

Services
Preceding station	Ningbo Rail Transit	Following station
Baozhuang towards Gaoqiao West	Line 1	Daqi towards Xiapu

Wuga Station (simplified Chinese: 邬隘站; traditional Chinese: 鄔隘站; pinyin: Wūgà Zhàn) is an elevated metro station in Ningbo, Zhejiang, China. Wuga Station situates in Daqi Subdistrict, on the north of planned Ningbo Container Hub Station. Construction of the station started in December 2012, and service began on March 19, 2016.

== Exits ==
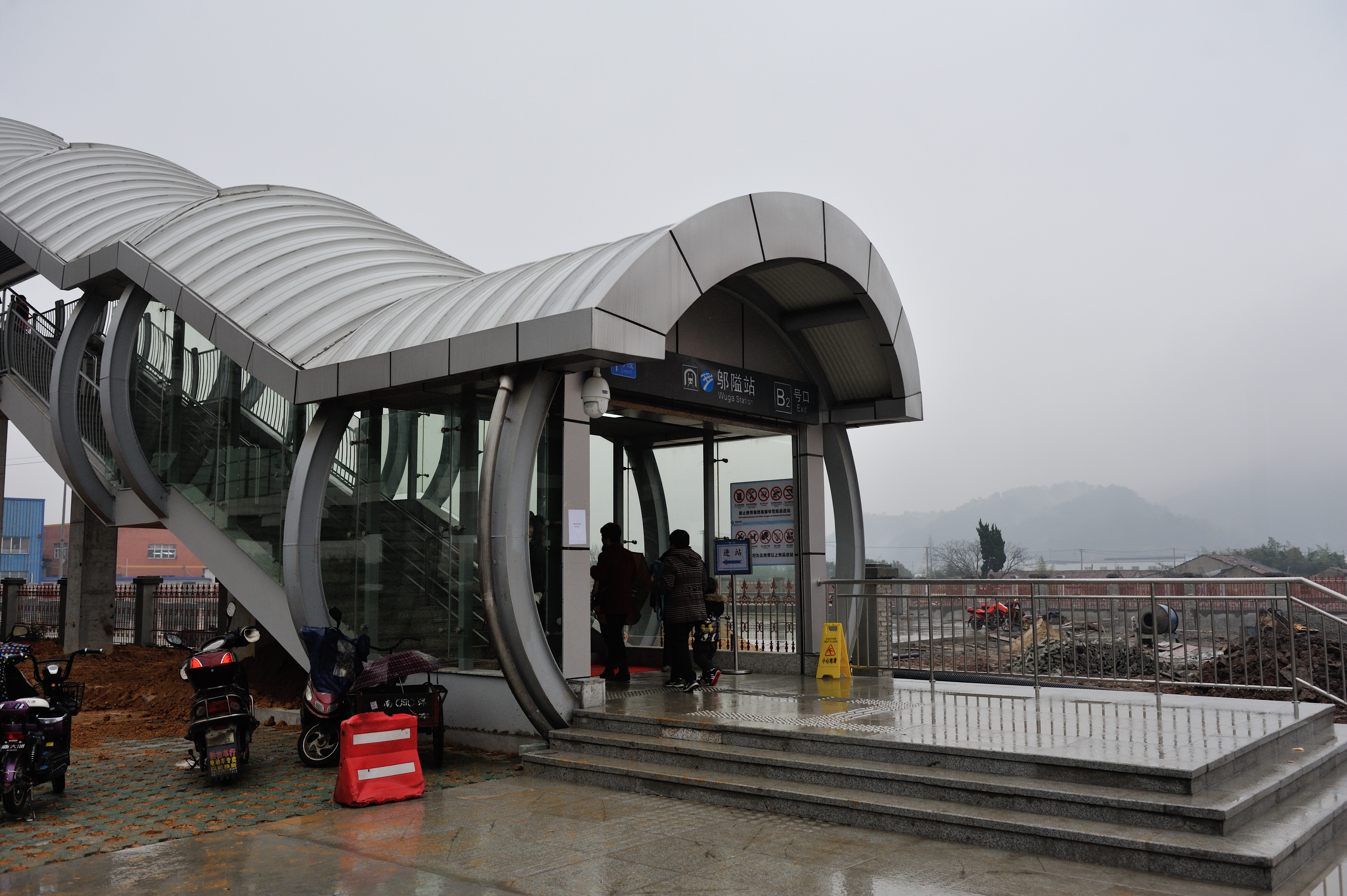
Exit B of Wuga Station

Wuga Station has two exits.

No	Suggested destinations
A	Qiantangjiang South Road, Lingfeng Mountain Road
B	Qiantangjiang South Road, Lingfeng Mountain Road
