= Haiyan North Road station =

Ningbo Metro station

Coordinates: 29.8628°N 121.6106°E

Haiyan North Road 海晏北路
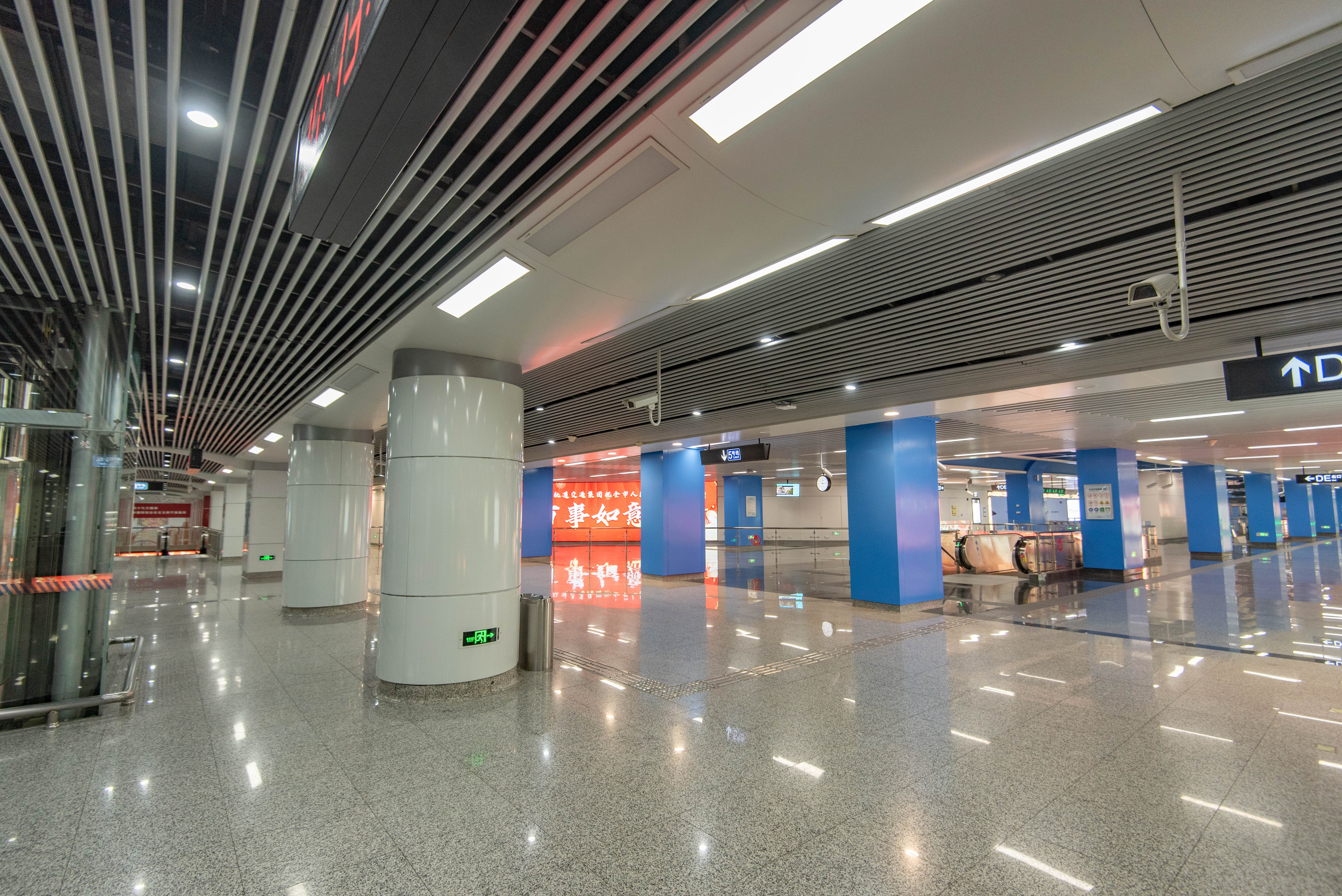
- Concourse

General information
- Location: Yinzhou District, Ningbo, Zhejiang; China
- Operated by: Ningbo Rail Transit Co. Ltd.
- Lines: Line 1 Line 5
- Platforms: 4 (2 island platforms)

Construction
- Structure type: Underground

History
- Opened: 30 May 2014

Services
| Preceding station | Ningbo Rail Transit | Following station |
|---|---|---|
| Shiji Avenue towards Gaoqiao West | Line 1 | Fuqing North Road towards Xiapu |
| Liuga towards Buzheng | Line 5 | Min'an East Road towards Luotuo Bridge |
Location

Haiyan North Road Station (Chinese: 海晏北路站; pinyin: Hǎiyàn Běilù Zhàn) is an interchange station on Line 1 and Line 5 of the Ningbo Rail Transit that started operations on 30 May 2014. It is situated under Ningchuan Road (Chinese: 宁穿路) in Yinzhou District of Ningbo City, Zhejiang Province, eastern China.

== Exits ==
| Exit number | Exit location |
|---|---|
| Exit A | Ningchuan Road, Haiyan North Road, Ningbo Culture Plaza |
| Exit B | Ningchuan Road, Haiyan North Road |
| Exit C | Haiyan North Road |

== Gallery ==
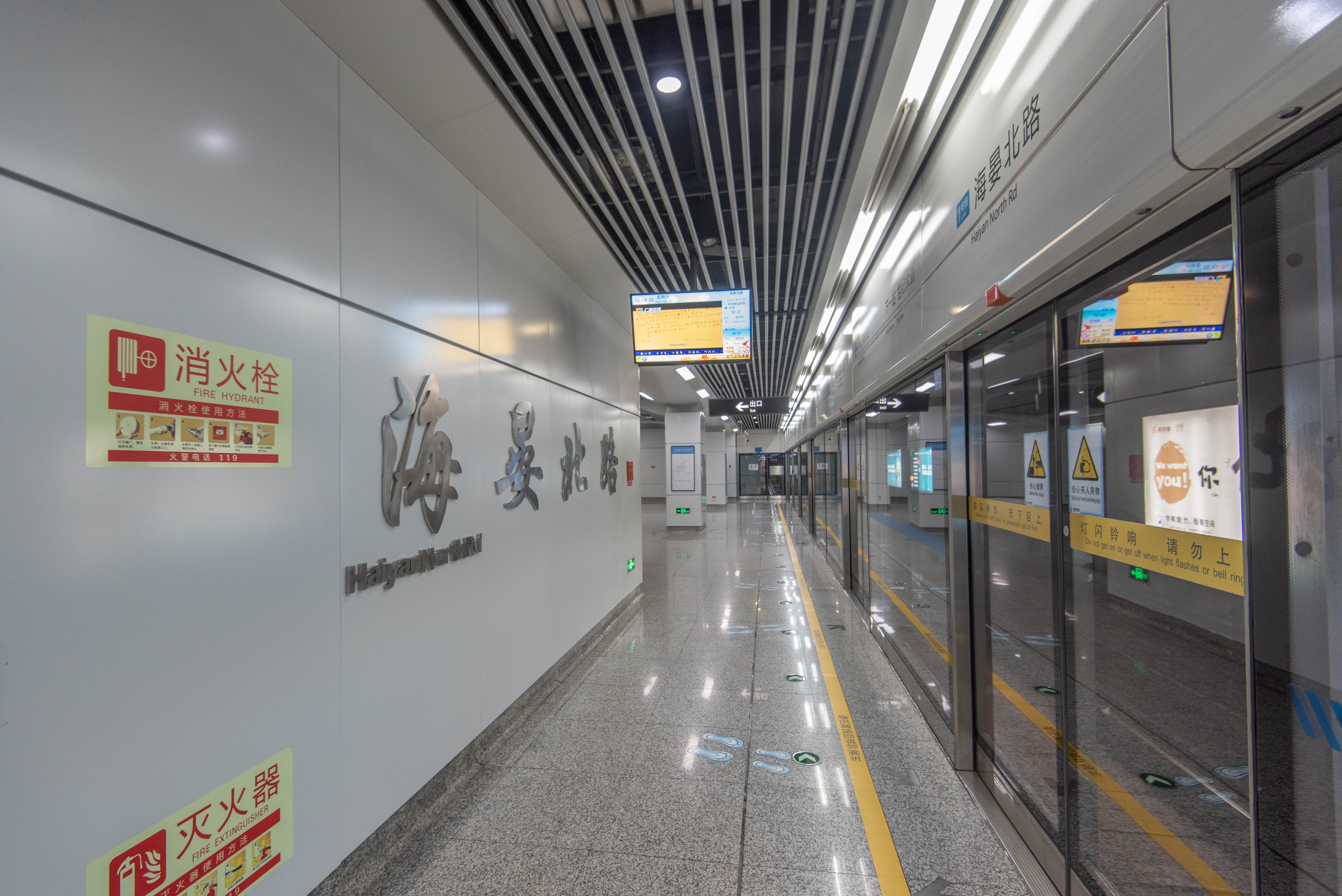
Line 1 platform

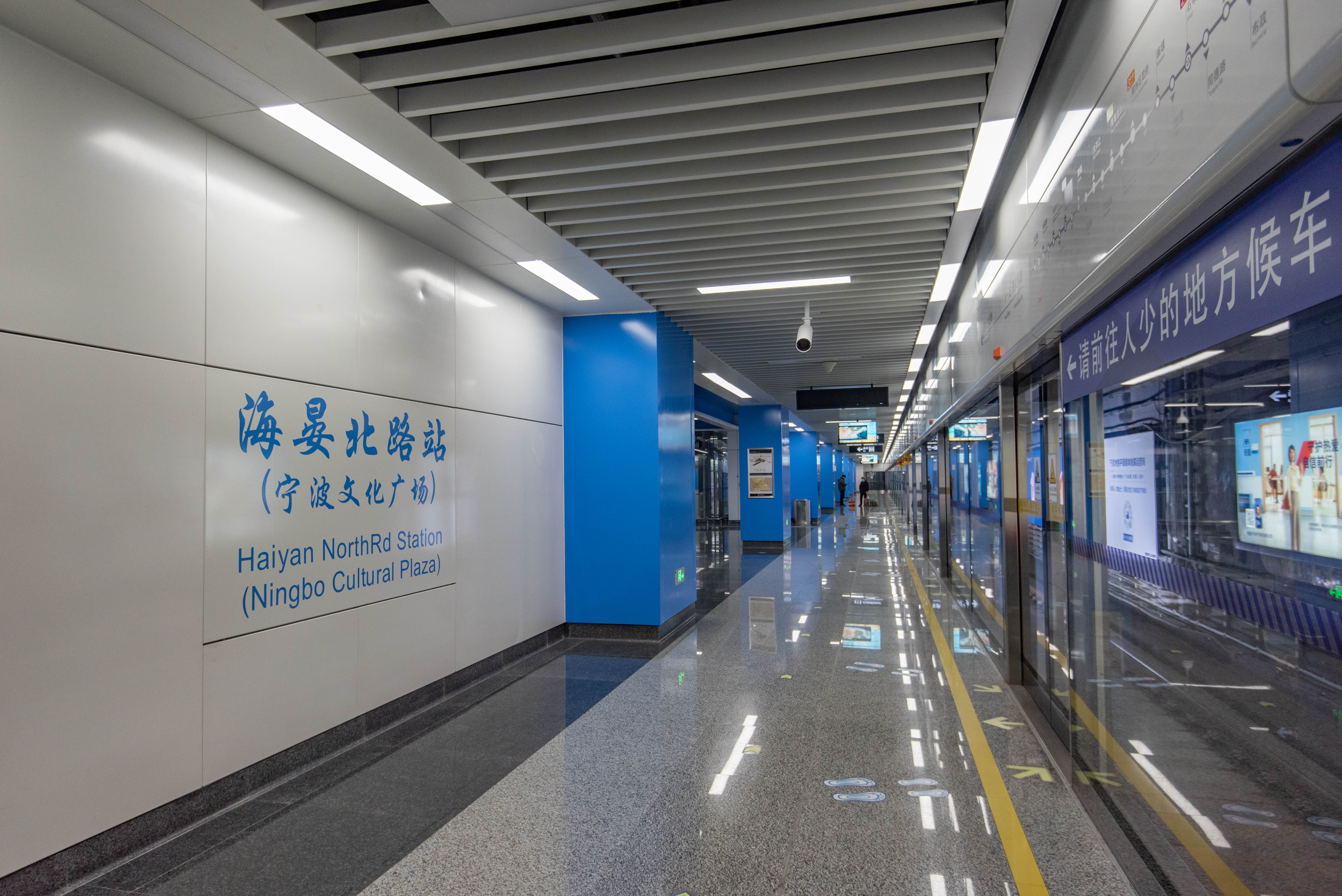
Line 5 platform
