= Shiji Avenue station =

Ningbo Metro station

Coordinates: 29.8616°N 121.5980°E

Shiji Avenue 世纪大道
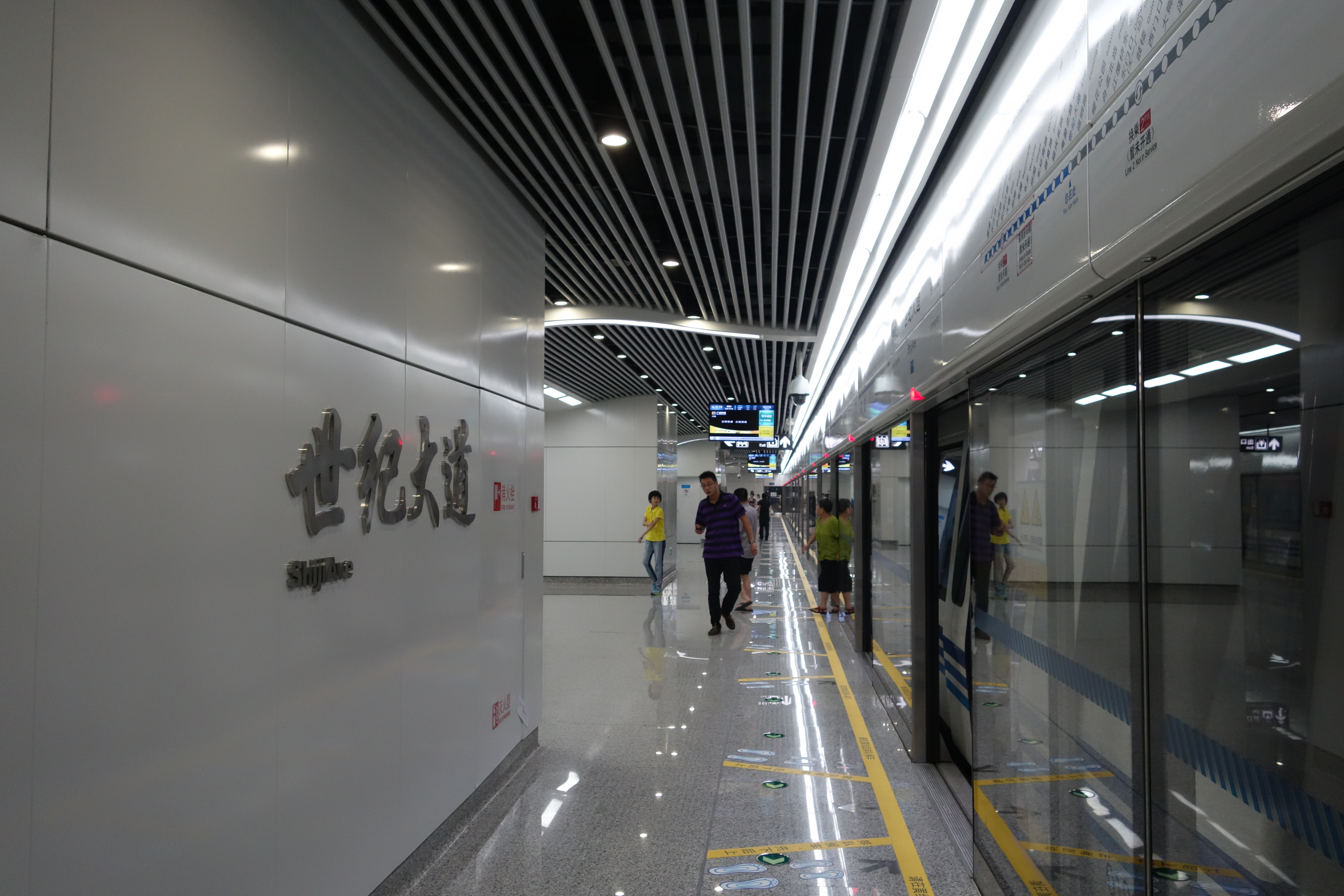

General information
- Location: Yinzhou District, Ningbo, Zhejiang; China
- Operated by: Ningbo Rail Transit Co. Ltd.
- Line: Line 1
- Platforms: 2 (1 island platform)

Construction
- Structure type: Underground

History
- Opened: 30 May 2014

Services
| Preceding station | Ningbo Rail Transit | Following station |
|---|---|---|
| Fuming Road towards Gaoqiao West | Line 1 | Haiyan North Road towards Xiapu |
Location

Shiji Avenue Station (simplified Chinese: 世纪大道站; traditional Chinese: 世紀大道站; pinyin: Shìjì Dàdào Zhàn; lit. 'Century Avenue Station'), is a metro station on Line 1 of the Ningbo Rail Transit that started operations on 30 May 2014. It is situated under Zhongshan East Road (Chinese: 中山东路) in Yinzhou District of Ningbo City, Zhejiang Province, eastern China.

== Exits ==
| Exit number | Exit location |
|---|---|
| Exit A | Zhongshan East Road, Century Avenue, Weijia bridge |
| Exit B | Zhongshan East Road, Canghai Road, Jiangnan Chunxiao Community |
| Exit C | Zhongshan East Road, Shiji Avenue, Zhongshan Huating Community |
