= Jiangxia Bridge East station =

Ningbo Metro station

Coordinates: 29.8719°N 121.5611°E

Jiangxia Bridge East 江厦桥东
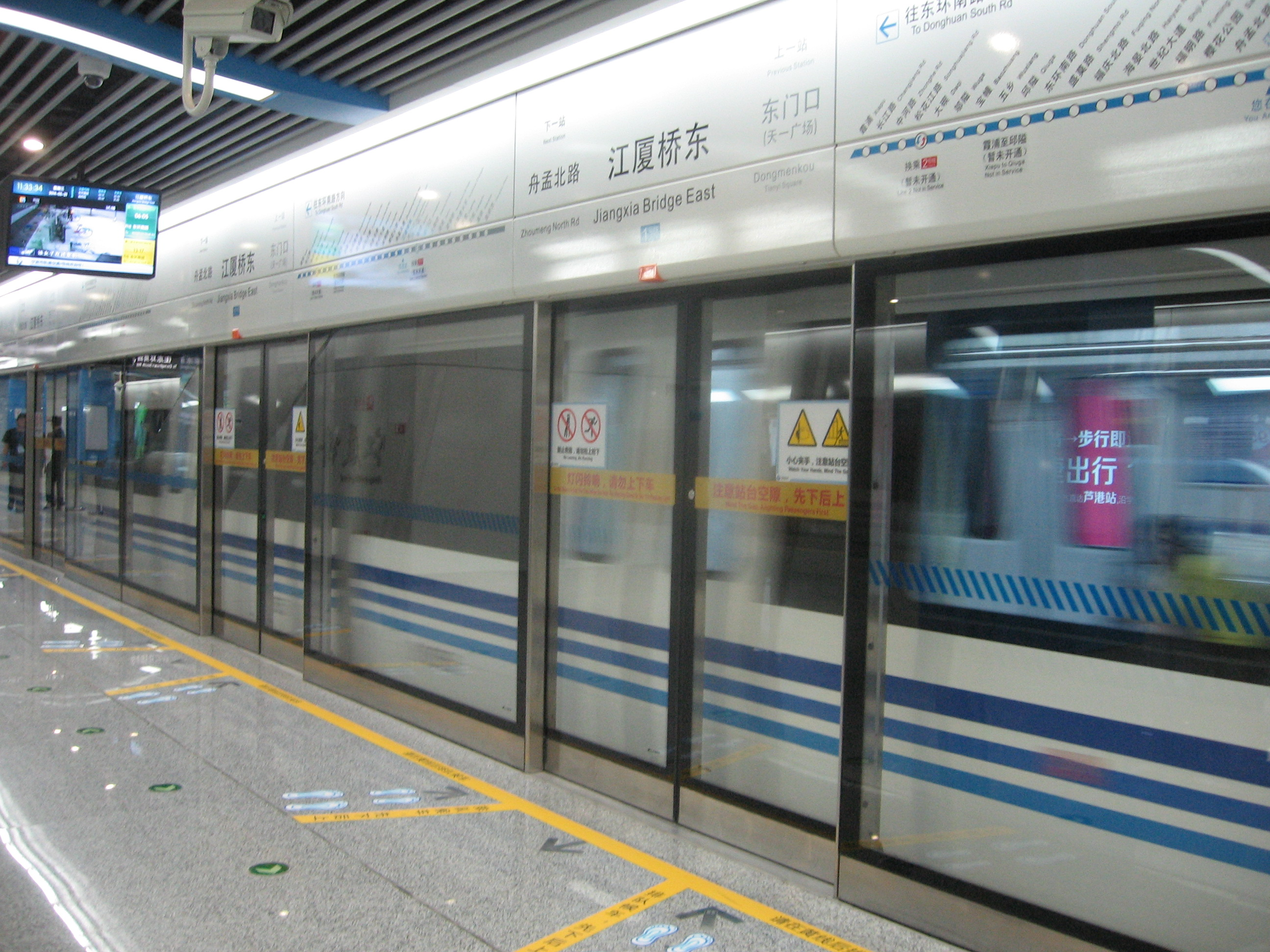

General information
- Location: Yinzhou District, Ningbo, Zhejiang; China
- Operated by: Ningbo Rail Transit Co. Ltd.
- Line(s): Line 1
- Platforms: 2 (1 island platform)

Construction
- Structure type: Underground

History
- Opened: 30 May 2014

Services
Preceding station	Ningbo Rail Transit	Following station
Dongmenkou towards Gaoqiao West	Line 1	Zhoumeng North Road towards Xiapu

Jiangxia Bridge East Station (simplified Chinese: 江厦桥东站; traditional Chinese: 江廈橋東站; pinyin: Jiāngxiàqiáodōng Zhàn) is a metro station on Line 1 of the Ningbo Rail Transit that started operations on 30 May 2014. It is situated under Zhongshan East Road (Chinese: 中山东路) in Yinzhou District of Ningbo City, Zhejiang Province, eastern China.

== Exits ==
Exit number	Exit location
Exit A	Zhongshan East Road, Shuguang Road, Zhongshan Shoufu, PLA No. 113 Hospital
Exit B	Zhongshan East Road, Jiangdong South Road, Shangri-La Hotel
Exit C	Zhongshan East Road, Jicao Street, Jincheng Yunting, Nanyuan E-Home Hotel
