= Shengmo Road station =

Ningbo Metro station

Coordinates: 29.8590°N 121.6324°E

Shengmo Road 盛莫路
- Line 1 platform

General information
- Location: Yinzhou District, Ningbo, Zhejiang; China
- Operator: Ningbo Rail Transit Co. Ltd.
- Lines: Line 1 Line 7
- Platforms: 2 (1 island platform)

Construction
- Structure type: Underground

History
- Opened: 30 May 2014 (Line 1); 29 August 2025 (Line 7)

Services
Preceding station	Ningbo Rail Transit	Following station
Fuqing North Road towards Gaoqiao West	Line 1	Donghuan South Road towards Xiapu
Beimingcheng Road towards Yufan	Line 7	Qiuga towards Yunlong
Location

Shengmo Road Station (Chinese: 盛莫路站; pinyin: Shèngmò Lù Zhàn) is a metro station on Line 1 and Line 7 of the Ningbo Rail Transit that started operations on 30 May 2014. It is situated under Zhongshan East Road (Chinese: 中山东路) in Yinzhou District, Ningbo.

== Exits ==
Exit number	Exit location
Exit A	Ningbo No.1 Firefighting Equipment Factory
Exit B	Yinzhou Lanqing School
Exit C	Shengmo Road, Ningchuang Road
Exit F	Shengmo Road
