= Baozhuang station =

Ningbo Metro station

Coordinates: 29.8419°N 121.7292°E

Baozhuang 宝幢
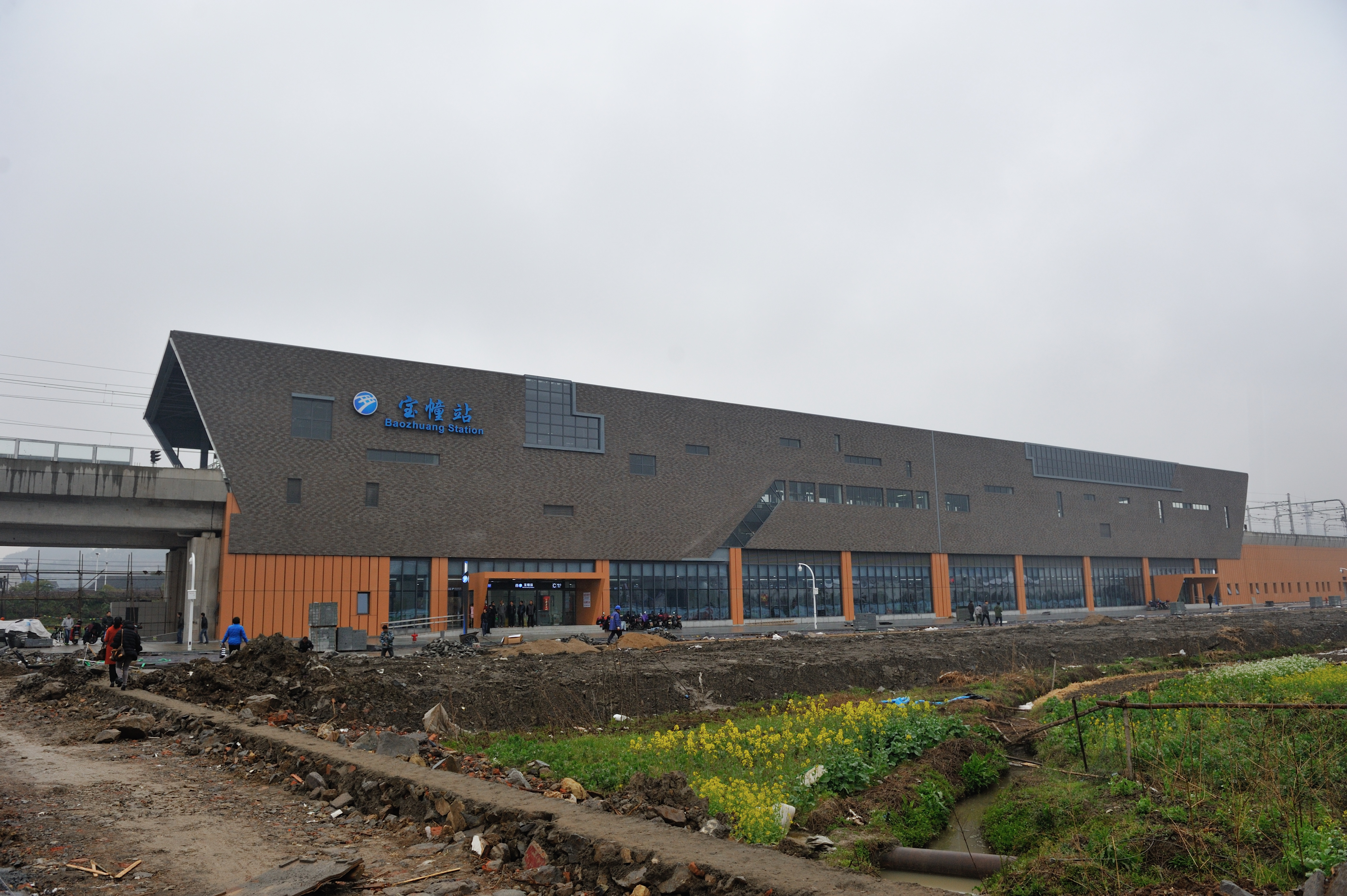

General information
- Location: Yinzhou District, Ningbo, Zhejiang; China
- Operator: Ningbo Rail Transit Co. Ltd.
- Line: Line 1
- Platforms: 2 (1 island platform)

Construction
- Structure type: Elevated

History
- Opened: March 19, 2016

Services
Preceding station	Ningbo Rail Transit	Following station
Wuxiang towards Gaoqiao West	Line 1	Wuga towards Xiapu
Location

Baozhuang Station (simplified Chinese: 宝幢站; traditional Chinese: 寶幢站; pinyin: Bǎozhuàng Zhàn) is an elevated metro station in Ningbo, Zhejiang, China. The station is situated near Baozhuang Village. Construction of the station started in December 2012 and the station started service on March 19, 2016.

== Exits ==
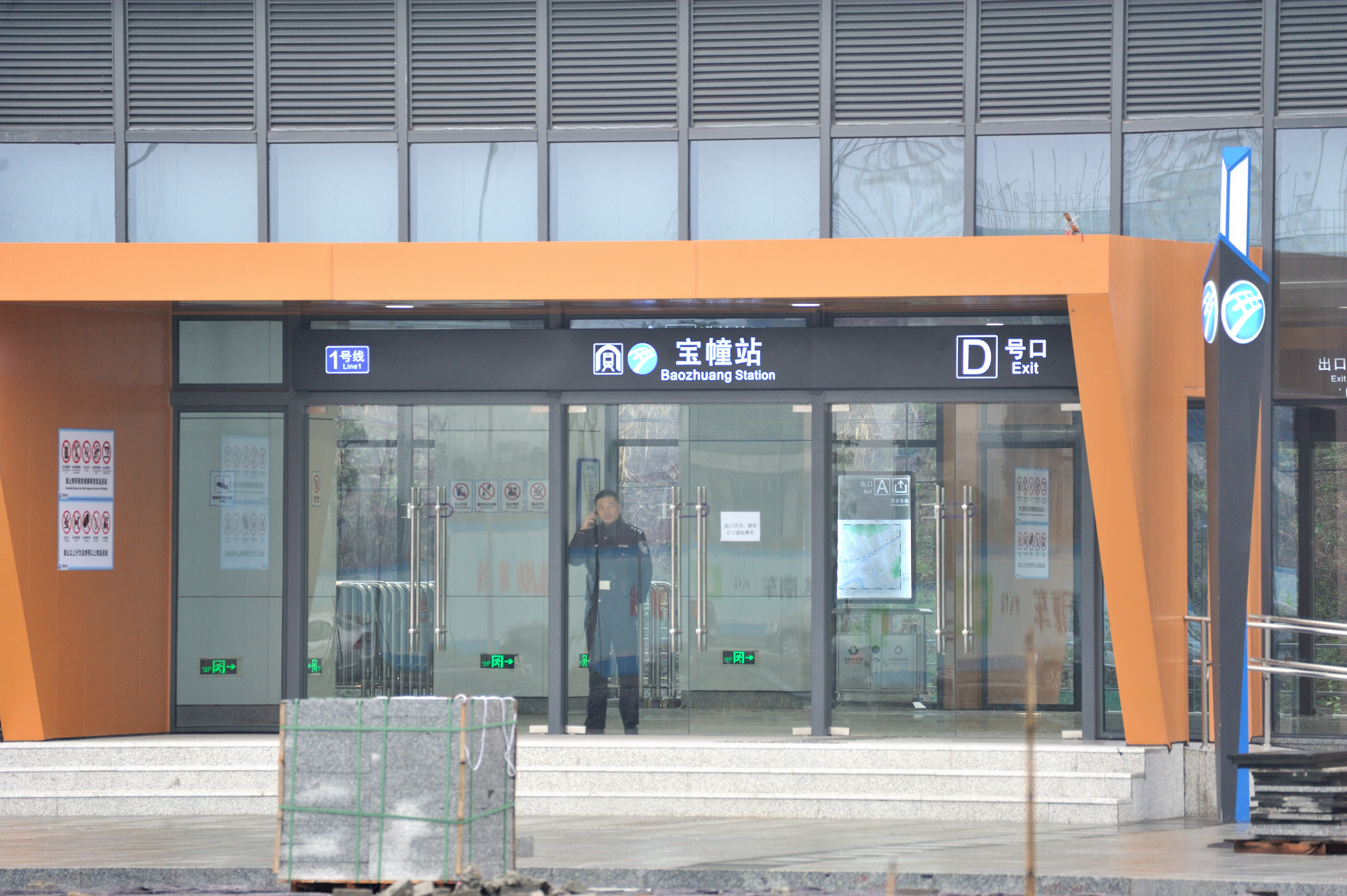
Exit D of Baozhuang Station

Baozhuang Station has four exits.

No	Suggested destinations
A	Wuxiang East Road
B	Wuxiang East Road
C	Wuxiang East Road
D	Wuxiang East Road
