= Wangchun Bridge station =

Metro station in Ningbo, China

Coordinates: 29.8843°N 121.5047°E

Wangchun Bridge 望春桥
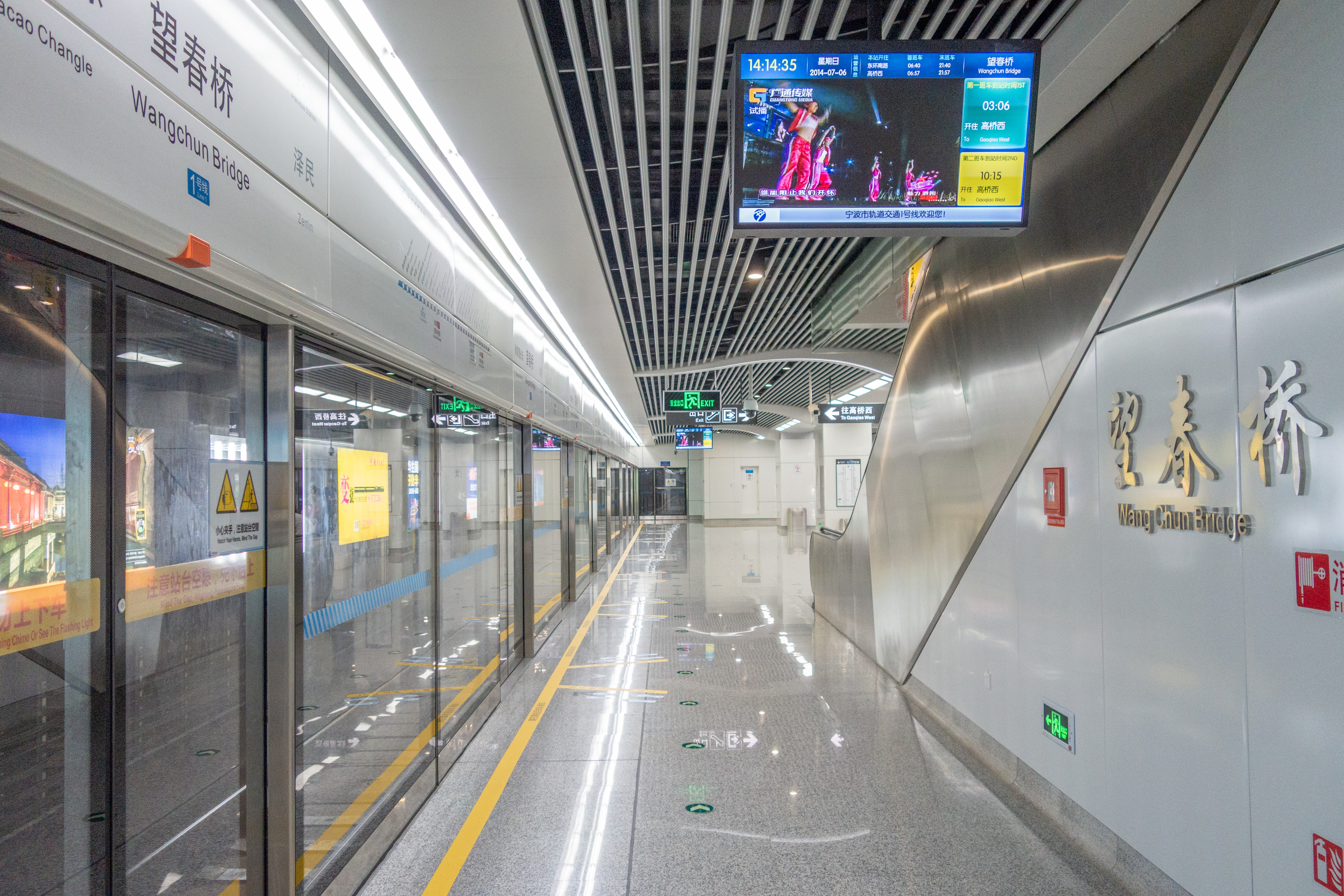
- Line 1 platform

General information
- Location: Haishu District, Ningbo, Zhejiang; China
- Operator: Ningbo Rail Transit Co. Ltd.
- Lines: Line 1 Line 6
- Platforms: 2 (1 island platform)

Construction
- Structure type: Underground

History
- Opened: 30 May 2014 (Line 1); 16 January 2026 (Line 6)
- Former names: Wangchun

Services
Preceding station	Ningbo Rail Transit	Following station
Xujiacao Changle towards Gaoqiao West	Line 1	Zemin towards Xiapu
Songjiacao towards Gulin	Line 6	Ningbo Traditional Chinese Medicine Hospital towards Honglian
Location

Wangchun Bridge Station (simplified Chinese: 望春桥站; traditional Chinese: 望春橋站; pinyin: Wàngchūnqiáo Zhàn) is a station on Line 1 and Line 6 of the Ningbo Rail Transit that started operations on 30 May 2014. It is situated under Wangchun Road (Chinese: 望春路) in Haishu District of Ningbo City, Zhejiang Province, eastern China.

== Exits ==
Exit number	Exit location
Exit A	Wangchun Road
Exit C	Wangchun Road, Xiangcheng Avenue
Exit D	Wangchun Road, Xinyuan Road
Exit F	Furui North Road
