= Zemin station =

Ningbo Metro station

Coordinates: 29.8811°N 121.5171°E

Zemin 泽民
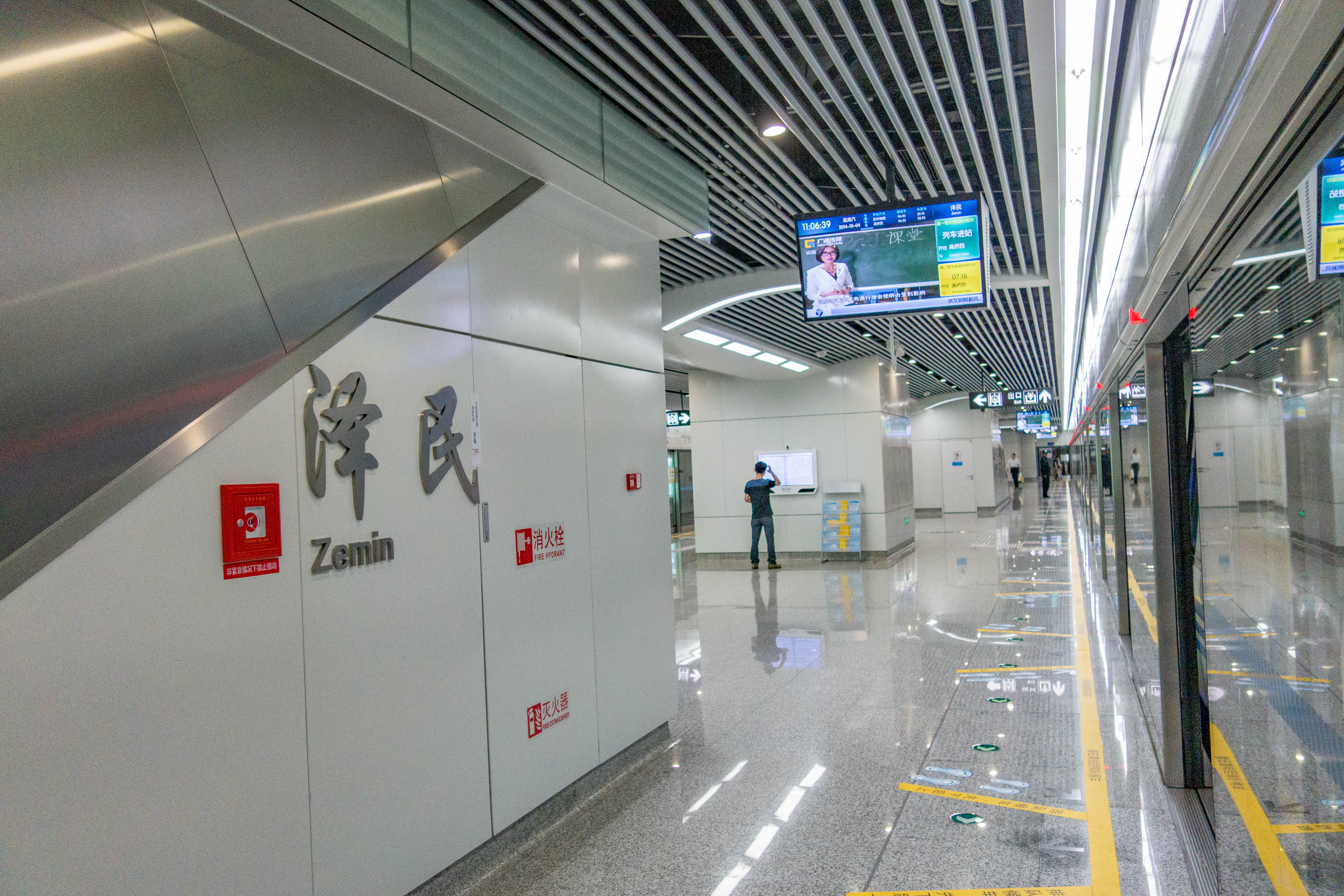

General information
- Location: Haishu District, Ningbo, Zhejiang; China
- Operated by: Ningbo Rail Transit Co. Ltd.
- Lines: Line 1 Line 8
- Platforms: 2 (1 island platform)

Construction
- Structure type: Underground

History
- Opened: 30 May 2014 (Line 1); 30 June 2025 (Line 8)
- Previous names: Huancheng West Road

Services
Preceding station	Ningbo Rail Transit	Following station
Wangchun Bridge towards Gaoqiao West	Line 1	Daqing Bridge towards Xiapu
Ningbo Municipal Hospital of TCM towards Kaiyuan Road	Line 8	Lianfeng towards Hansong Road
Location

Zemin Station (simplified Chinese: 泽民站; traditional Chinese: 澤民站; pinyin: Zémín Zhàn) is a station on Line 1 and Line 8 of the Ningbo Rail Transit that started operations on 30 May 2014. It is situated under Zhongshan West Road (Chinese: 中山西路) and Huancheng West Road (Chinese: 环城西路) in Haishu District of Ningbo City, Zhejiang Province, China.

== Exits ==
Exit number	Exit location
Exit A	Zhongshan West Road (north), Huancheng West Road, Nianjiu Lane
Exit B	Zhongshan West Road (north), Liyuan North Road
Exit C	Zhongshan West Road (south), Qianfeng Street, Qiyuan Street
Exit D	Liyuan North Road (west), Chengbo Street
Exit E	Zhongshan West Road (north), Liyuan North Road (west)
