= Songhuajiang Road station =

Ningbo Metro station

Coordinates: 29.9068°N 121.8043°E

Songhuajiang Road 松花江路
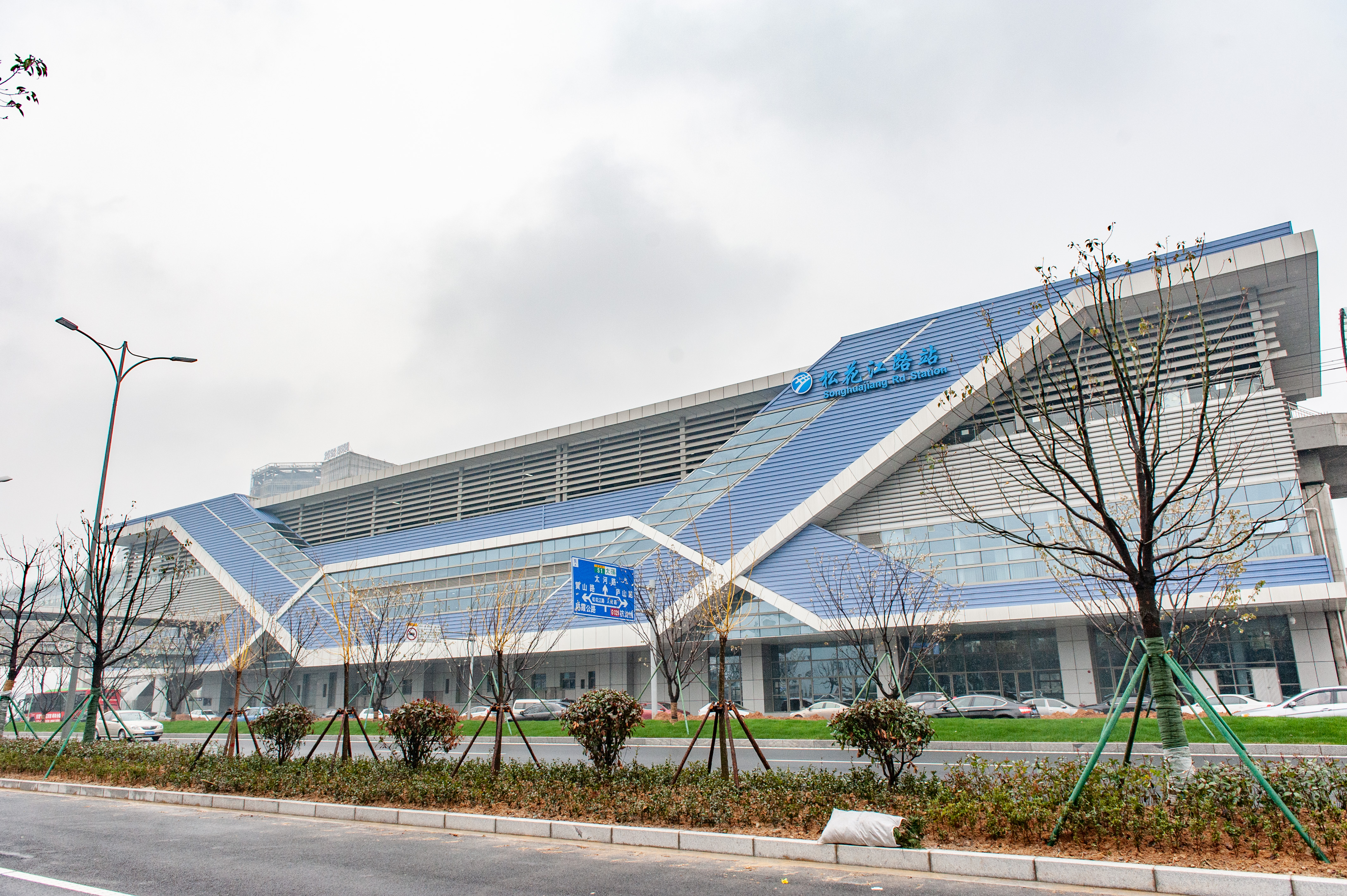

General information
- Location: Beilun District, Ningbo, Zhejiang; China
- Operated by: Ningbo Rail Transit Co. Ltd.
- Line: Line 1
- Platforms: 2 (2 side platforms)

Construction
- Structure type: Elevated

History
- Opened: 19 March 2016

Services
Preceding station	Ningbo Rail Transit	Following station
Daqi towards Gaoqiao West	Line 1	Zhonghe Road towards Xiapu
Location

Songhuajiang Road Station (Chinese: 松花江路站; pinyin: Sōnghuājiāng Zhàn) is an elevated metro station in Ningbo, Zhejiang, China. Songhuajiang Road Station situates in Daqi Subdistrict near Taishan Road. Construction of the station started in December 2012, and service began on March 19, 2016.

== Exits ==
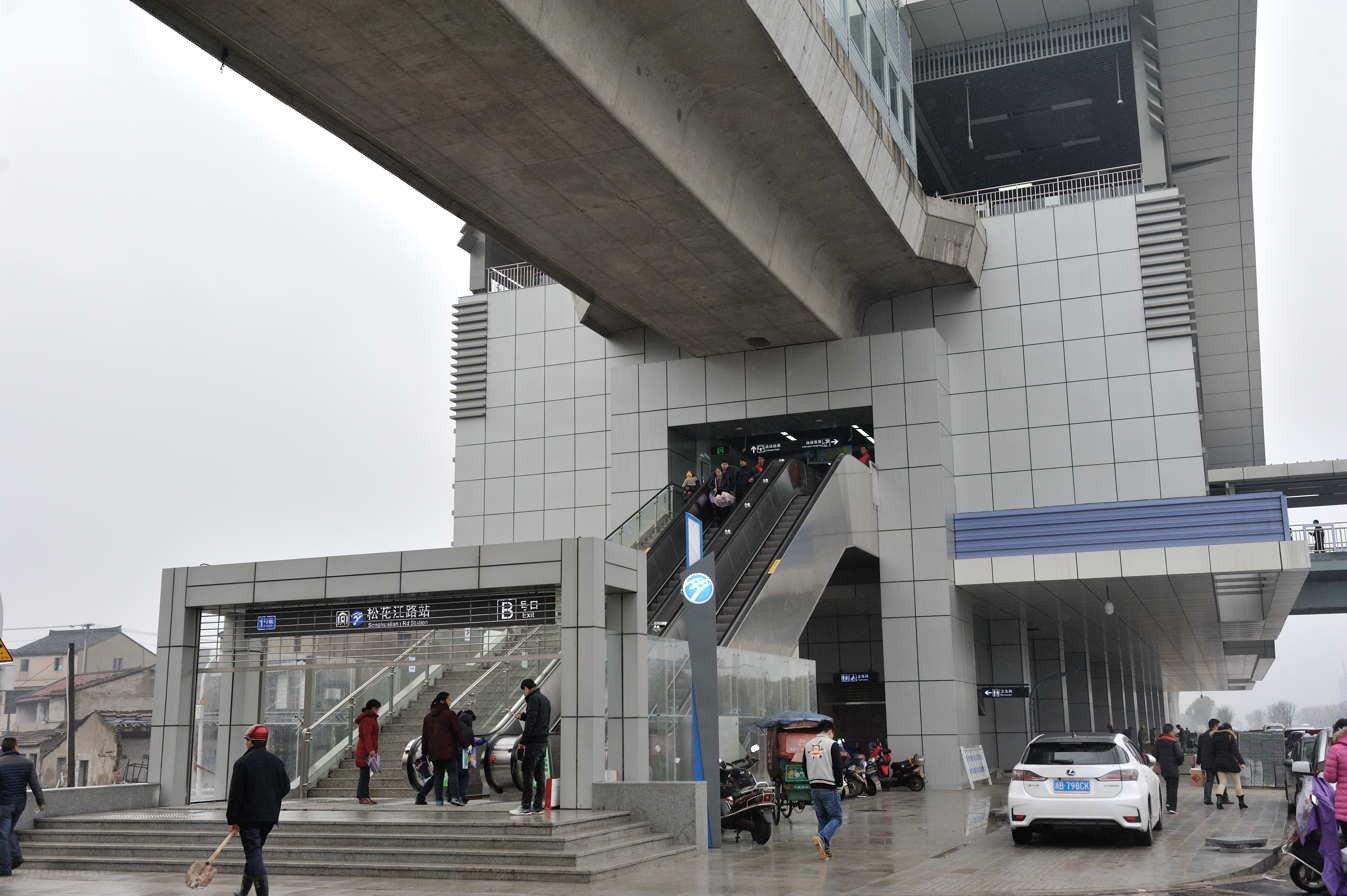
Exit B of Songhuajiang Road Station

Songhuajiang Road Station has two exits.

No	Suggested destinations
A	Taishan West Road, Songhuajiang Road
B	Taishan West Road, Songhuajiang Road
