= Lugang station =

Ningbo Metro station

Coordinates: 29.8927°N 121.4830°E

Lugang 芦港
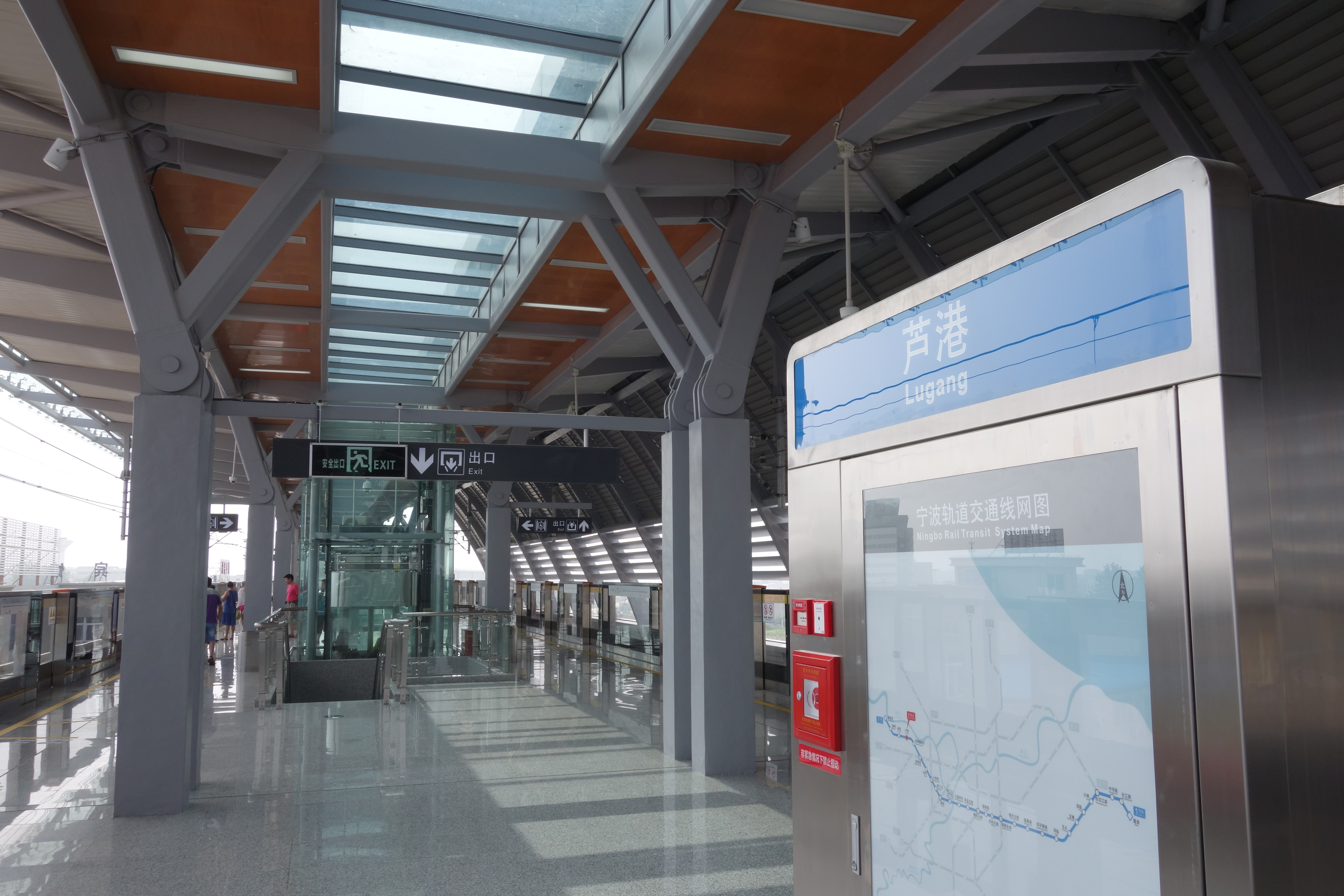
- The platform of Lugang station in 2014

General information
- Location: Haishu District, Ningbo, Zhejiang; China
- Operated by: Ningbo Rail Transit Co. Ltd.
- Line(s): Line 1
- Platforms: 2 (1 island platform)

Construction
- Structure type: Elevated

History
- Opened: 30 May 2014

Services
Preceding station	Ningbo Rail Transit	Following station
Liangzhu towards Gaoqiao West	Line 1	Xujiacao Changle towards Xiapu

Lugang Station (simplified Chinese: 芦港站; traditional Chinese: 蘆港站; pinyin: Lúgǎng Zhàn) is a station on Line 1 of the Ningbo Rail Transit that started operations on 30 May 2014. It is situated over Wangchun Road (Chinese: 望春路) in Haishu District of Ningbo City, Zhejiang Province, eastern China.

== Exits ==
Exit number	Exit location
Exit A1	Wangchun Road (north)
Exit A2	Lujiazhuang Road
Exit A3	Xueyuan Road
Exit A4	Wangchun Road (south)
