= Donghuan South Road station =

Ningbo Metro station

Coordinates: 29.8554°N 121.6470°E

Donghuan South Road 东环南路
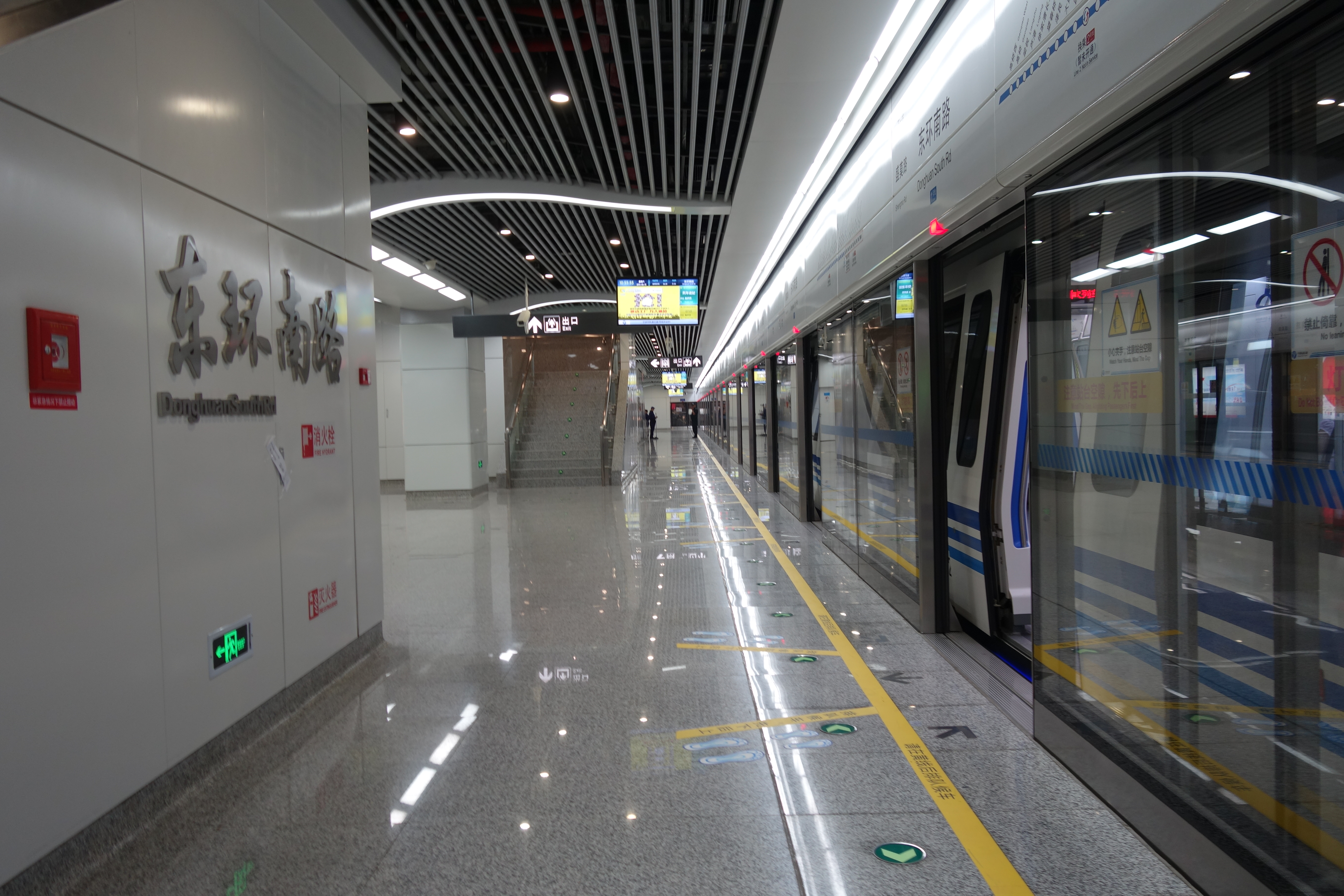
- The platforms at Donghuan South Road Station in 2014

General information
- Location: Yinzhou District, Ningbo, Zhejiang; China
- Operated by: Ningbo Rail Transit Co. Ltd.
- Line: Line 1
- Platforms: 2 (1 island platform)

Construction
- Structure type: Underground

History
- Opened: 30 May 2014

Services
Preceding station	Ningbo Rail Transit	Following station
Shengmo Road towards Gaoqiao West	Line 1	Qiuga East towards Xiapu
Location

Donghuan South Road Station (simplified Chinese: 东环南路站; traditional Chinese: 東環南路站; pinyin: Dōnghuán Nánlù Zhàn) is a subway station on Line 1 of the Ningbo Rail Transit that started operations on 30 May 2014 and served as the terminus until extension of the line to Xiapu on 19 March 2016. It is situated under Ningchuan Road (Chinese: 宁穿路) in Yinzhou District, Ningbo.

== Exits ==
Exit number	Exit location
Exit A	G329, Pugang Road
Exit D	G329, Ningbo Rail Transit Co., Ltd.
Exit E	Donghuan South Road
