= Gaoqiao station (Ningbo Rail Transit) =

Metro station in Ningbo, China

Coordinates: 29.9038°N 121.4597°E

Gaoqiao 高桥
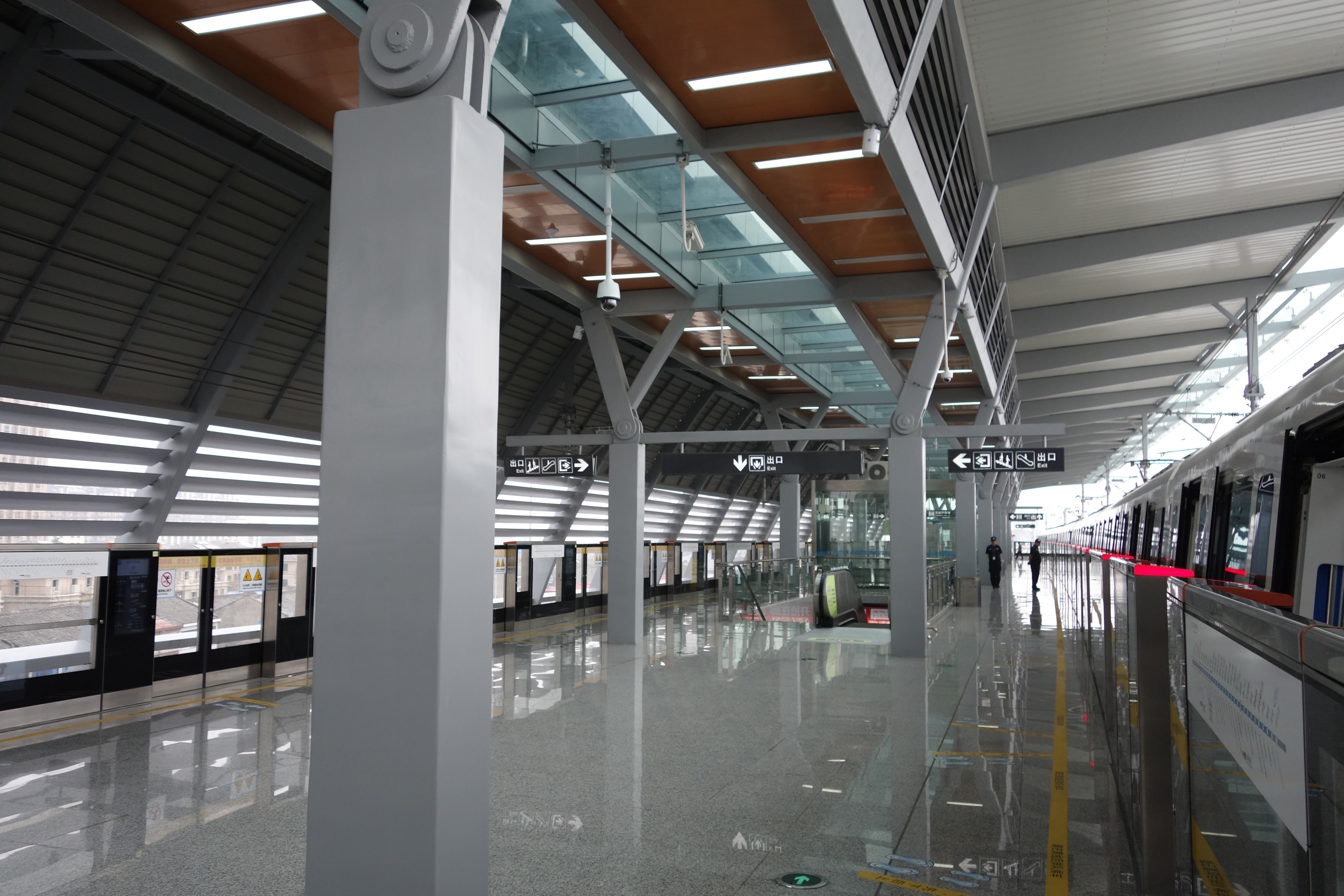

General information
- Location: Haishu District, Ningbo, Zhejiang; China
- Operated by: Ningbo Rail Transit Co. Ltd.
- Line(s): Line 1
- Platforms: 2 (1 island platform)

Construction
- Structure type: Elevated

History
- Opened: 30 May 2014

Services
Preceding station	Ningbo Rail Transit	Following station
Gaoqiao West Terminus	Line 1	Liangzhu towards Xiapu

Gaoqiao Station (simplified Chinese: 高桥站; traditional Chinese: 高橋站; pinyin: Gāoqiáo Zhàn) is a station on Line 1 of the Ningbo Rail Transit that started operations on 30 May 2014. It is situated over Wangchun Road (Chinese: 望春路) in Haishu District of Ningbo City, Zhejiang Province, eastern China.

== Exits ==
Exit number	Exit location
Exit A1	Gaoqiao East Road
Exit A2	Gaoqiao Middle Road
Exit A3	Yangjiacao Road
Exit A4	Wenhua Road
