= Liangzhu station (Ningbo Rail Transit) =

Ningbo Metro station

Coordinates: 29.8973°N 121.4724°E

Liangzhu 梁祝
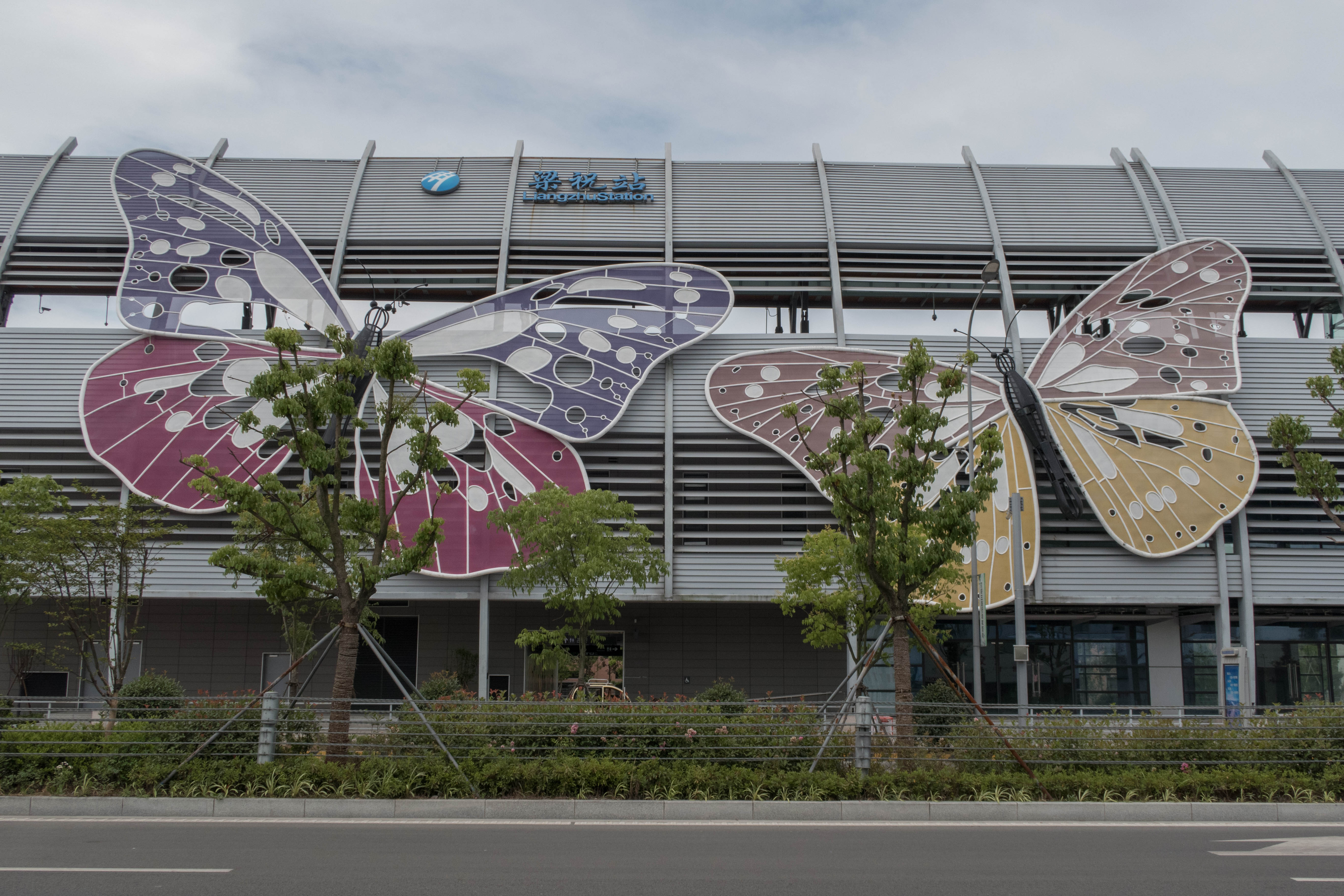

General information
- Location: Haishu District, Ningbo, Zhejiang; China
- Operated by: Ningbo Rail Transit Co. Ltd.
- Line(s): Line 1
- Platforms: 2 (1 island platform)

Construction
- Structure type: Elevated

History
- Opened: 30 May 2014
- Previous names: Xisan Road

Services
Preceding station	Ningbo Rail Transit	Following station
Gaoqiao towards Gaoqiao West	Line 1	Lugang towards Xiapu

Liangzhu Station (Chinese: 梁祝站; pinyin: Liángzhù Zhàn) is a station on Line 1 of the Ningbo Rail Transit that started operations on 30 May 2014. It is near Liangzhu Culture Park (Chinese: 梁祝文化公园) in Haishu District, Ningbo City, Zhejiang Province, eastern China.

== Exits ==
Exit number	Exit location
Exit A1	Wangchun Road (north)
Exit A2	Gaoqiao East Road, Liangzhu Road
Exit A3	Jiang'an Road
Exit A4	Wangchun Road (south)
