= Changjiang Road station (Ningbo Rail Transit) =

Ningbo Metro station

Coordinates: 29.8933°N 121.8394°E

Changjiang Road 长江路
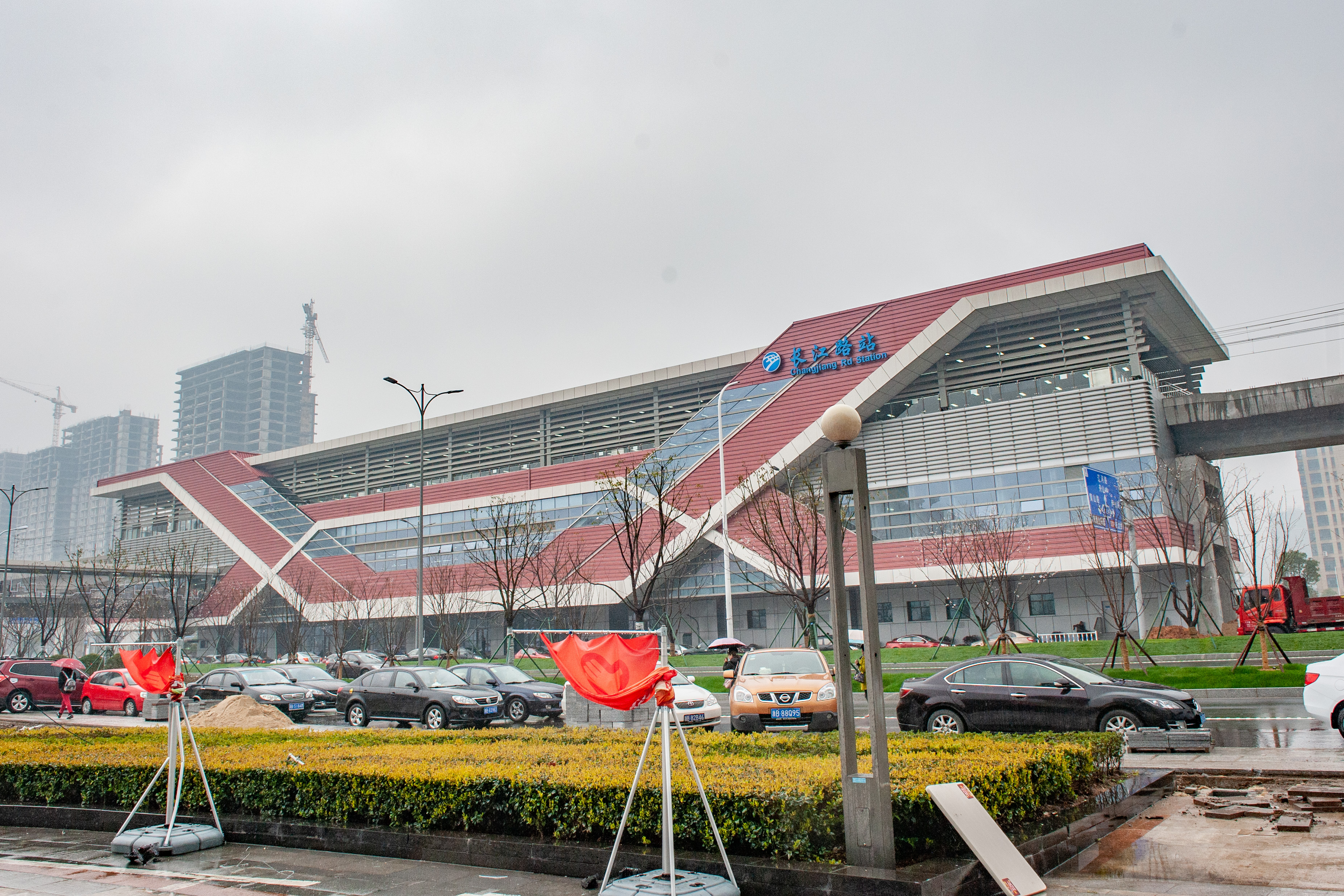

General information
- Location: Beilun District, Ningbo, Zhejiang; China
- Operator: Ningbo Rail Transit Co. Ltd.
- Line: Line 1
- Platforms: 2 (2 side platforms)

Construction
- Structure type: Elevated

History
- Opened: 19 March 2016

Services
Preceding station	Ningbo Rail Transit	Following station
Zhonghe Road towards Gaoqiao West	Line 1	Xiapu Terminus
Location

Changjiang Road Station (simplified Chinese: 长江路站; traditional Chinese: 長江路站; pinyin: Chángjiāng Lù Zhàn) is an elevated metro station in Ningbo, Zhejiang, China. Changjiang Road Station is located in Xinqi Subdistrict near Taishan Road. Construction of the station started in December 2012, and service began on March 19, 2016.

== Exits ==
Changjiang Road Station has two exits.

No	Suggested destinations
A	Taishan West Road, Fubang Century Plaza
B	Taishan West Road
