= Liangzhu station =

Liangzhu Station may refer to:

- Liangzhu station (Hangzhou Metro), a station on the Hangzhou Metro in Hangzhou, Zhejiang.
- Liangzhu station (Ningbo Rail Transit), a station on the Ningbo Metro in Ningbo, Zhejiang.
