= Line 1 (Ningbo Rail Transit) =

Metro line in Ningbo, China

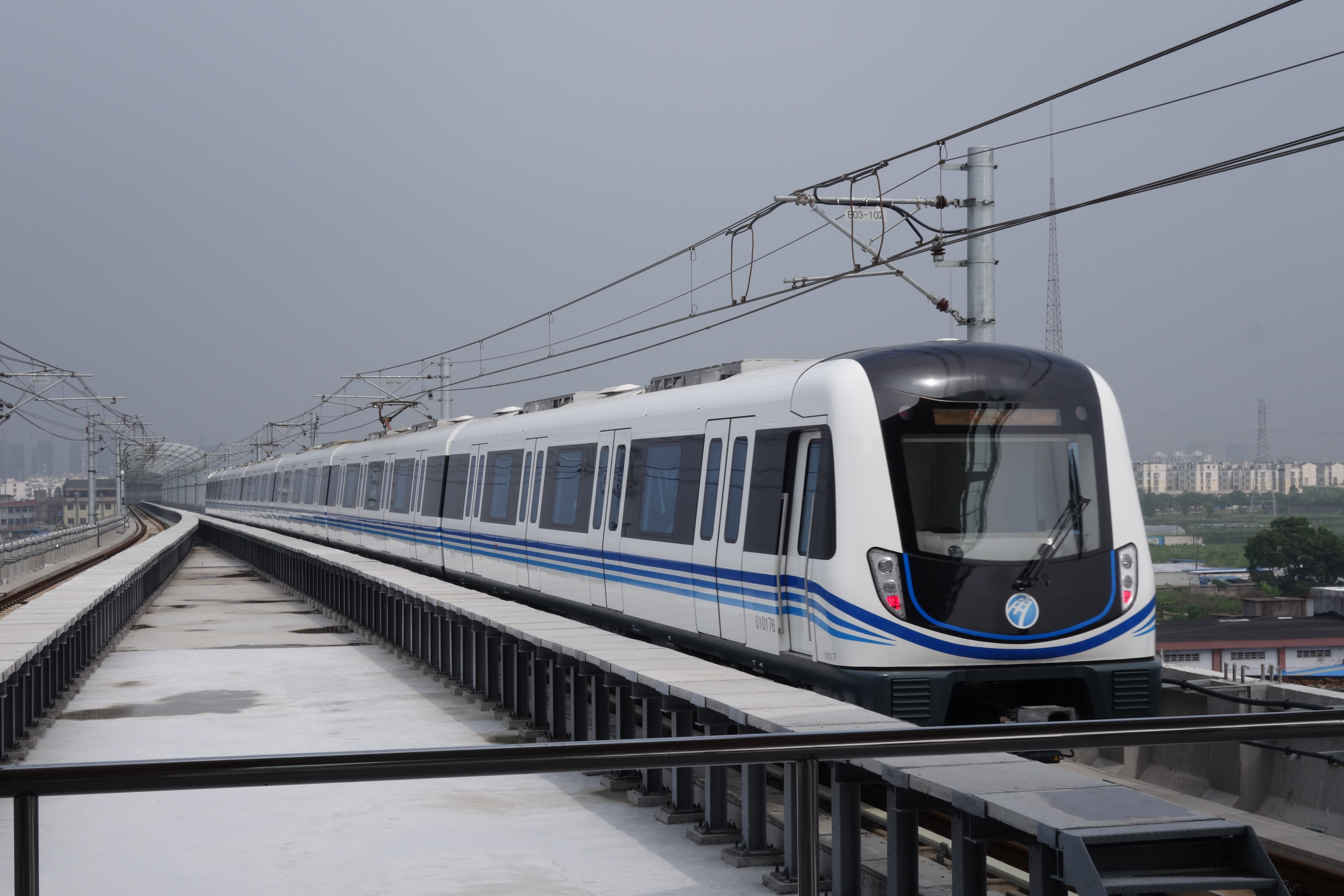
- Line 1 train

Overview
- Status: Operational
- Owner: Ningbo
- Locale: Ningbo, Zhejiang, China
- Termini: Gaoqiao West; Xiapu
- Stations: 29
- Website: nbmetro.com

Service
- Type: Rapid transit
- System: Ningbo Rail Transit
- Operator(s): Ningbo Rail Transit Co., Ltd.
- Depot(s): Tiantongzhuang Depot, Jiangnan Coach Yard, Zhutang Village Coach Yard

History
- Opened: May 30, 2014; 11 years ago

Technical
- Line length: 46.165 km (28.69 mi) (total)
- Number of tracks: 2
- Character: Underground; Elevated
- Track gauge: 1,435 mm (4 ft 8 1/2 in)
- Electrification: Overhead catenary with 1,500 V DC
- Operating speed: 80 km/h
Route map

Line 1 of Ningbo Rail Transit (Chinese: 宁波轨道交通1号线) is a rapid transit line in Ningbo. It starts from Gaoqiao Town in the west, crosses the central area of Ningbo, and reaches Beilun District in the east. The line started service on May 30, 2014.

== Route ==
Line 1 is the first metro line in Ningbo, stretching in the east–west direction. The Phase 1 section starts as elevated rail from Gaoqiao Town in the west and turns underground when it approaches Haishu District (Wangchun Bridge Station). The tunnel stretches under Zhongshan Road, an east–west arterial road in Ningbo while crossing Fenghua River to enter Yinzhou District. The route travels through the Ningbo East New Town, where Phase 1 terminates (Donghuan South Road Station). Phase 2 starts underground at Donghuan South Road Station and continues as elevated rail after Qiuga East Station. The route travels through rural area of Yinzhou District and Beilun District, before entering Downtown Beilun around Daqi Station. The final section travels to the eastern end of Downtown Beilun before terminating at Xiapu Station. Phase 1, connecting Gaoqiao, Xiapu, Yinzhou, and Ningbo East New Town, started service on May 30, 2014. The rest section from Ningbo East New Town to Beilun District opened on March 19, 2016. The line has 29 stations in total, of which 13 are elevated and the 16 are underground. Starting from March 2016, all 29 stations of Line 1 are operational.

== Timeline ==
Segment	Commencement	Length	Station(s)	Name
Gaoqiao West — Donghuan South Road	30 May 2014	20.8 km (12.92 mi)	20	Phase 1
Donghuan South Road — Xiapu	19 March 2016	25.3 km (15.72 mi)	9	Phase 2

== Stations ==
Service routes		Station name		Connections	Distance km		Location
Service routes		English	Chinese	Connections	Distance km		Location
●		Gaoqiao West	高桥西		0.00	0.00	Haishu
●		Gaoqiao	高桥		1.52	1.52	Haishu
●		Liangzhu	梁祝		1.42	2.94	Haishu
●		Lugang	芦港		1.16	4.10	Haishu
●		Xujiacao Changle	徐家漕长乐		0.98	5.08	Haishu
●	●	Wangchun Bridge	望春桥	6	1.33	6.41	Haishu
●	●	Zemin	泽民	8	1.24	7.65	Haishu
●	●	Daqing Bridge	大卿桥	4	1.10	8.75	Haishu
●	●	Ximenkou	西门口		0.78	9.53	Haishu
●	●	Gulou	鼓楼	2	0.97	10.50	Haishu
●	●	Dongmenkou (Tianyi Square)	东门口（天一广场）		0.62	11.12	Haishu
●	●	Jiangxia Bridge East	江厦桥东		0.94	12.06	Yinzhou
●	●	Zhoumeng North Road	舟孟北路		0.89	12.95	Yinzhou
●	●	Sakura Park	樱花公园	3	0.75	13.70	Yinzhou
●	●	Fuming Road	福明路		1.22	14.92	Yinzhou
●	●	Shiji Avenue	世纪大道		0.90	15.82	Yinzhou
●	●	Haiyan North Road	海晏北路	5	1.35	17.17	Yinzhou
●	●	Fuqing North Road	福庆北路		0.95	18.12	Yinzhou
●	●	Shengmo Road	盛莫路	7	1.18	19.30	Yinzhou
●	●	Donghuan South Road	东环南路		1.50	20.80	Yinzhou
●		Qiuga East	邱隘东		1.25	22.05	Yinzhou
●		Wuxiang	五乡		3.25	25.30	Yinzhou
●		Baozhuang	宝幢		4.22	29.52	Yinzhou
●		Wuga	邬隘		6.45	35.97	Beilun
●		Daqi	大碶		2.38	38.35	Beilun
●		Songhuajiang Road	松花江路		2.15	40.5	Beilun
●		Zhonghe Road	中河路		2.40	42.90	Beilun
●		Changjiang Road	长江路		1.38	44.28	Beilun
●		Xiapu	霞浦		1.29	45.57	Beilun
