= Gaoqiao West station =

Metro station in Ningbo, China

Coordinates: 29.9130°N 121.4491°E

Gaoqiao West 高桥西
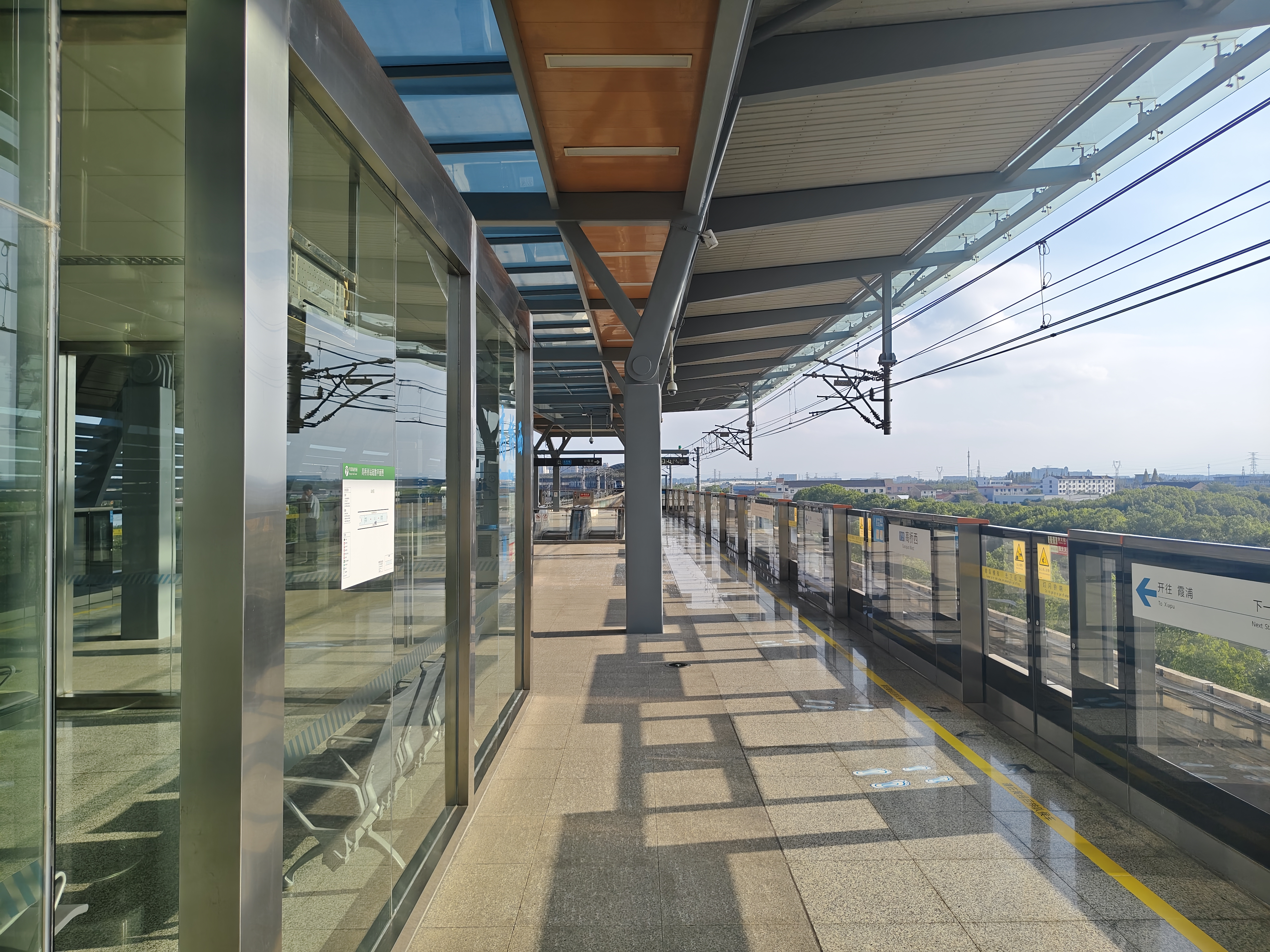

General information
- Location: Haishu District, Ningbo, Zhejiang; China
- Operated by: Ningbo Rail Transit Co. Ltd.
- Line: Line 1
- Platforms: 2 (1 island platform)

Construction
- Structure type: Elevated

History
- Opened: 30 May 2014

Services
Preceding station	Ningbo Rail Transit	Following station
Terminus	Line 1	Gaoqiao towards Xiapu
Location

Gaoqiao West Station (simplified Chinese: 高桥西站; traditional Chinese: 高橋西站; pinyin: Gāoqiáoxī Zhàn) is a station on Line 1 of the Ningbo Rail Transit that started operations on 30 May 2014. It is situated over Daxiba Road (Chinese: 大西坝路) in Haishu District of Ningbo City, Zhejiang Province, eastern China.

== Exits ==
Exit number	Exit location
Exit A	Gaoqiao West Road
Exit B	Gaoqiao West Road
Exit C	Daxiba Road
Exit D	Daxiba Road
