= Ningbo Rail Transit =

Rapid transit system in China

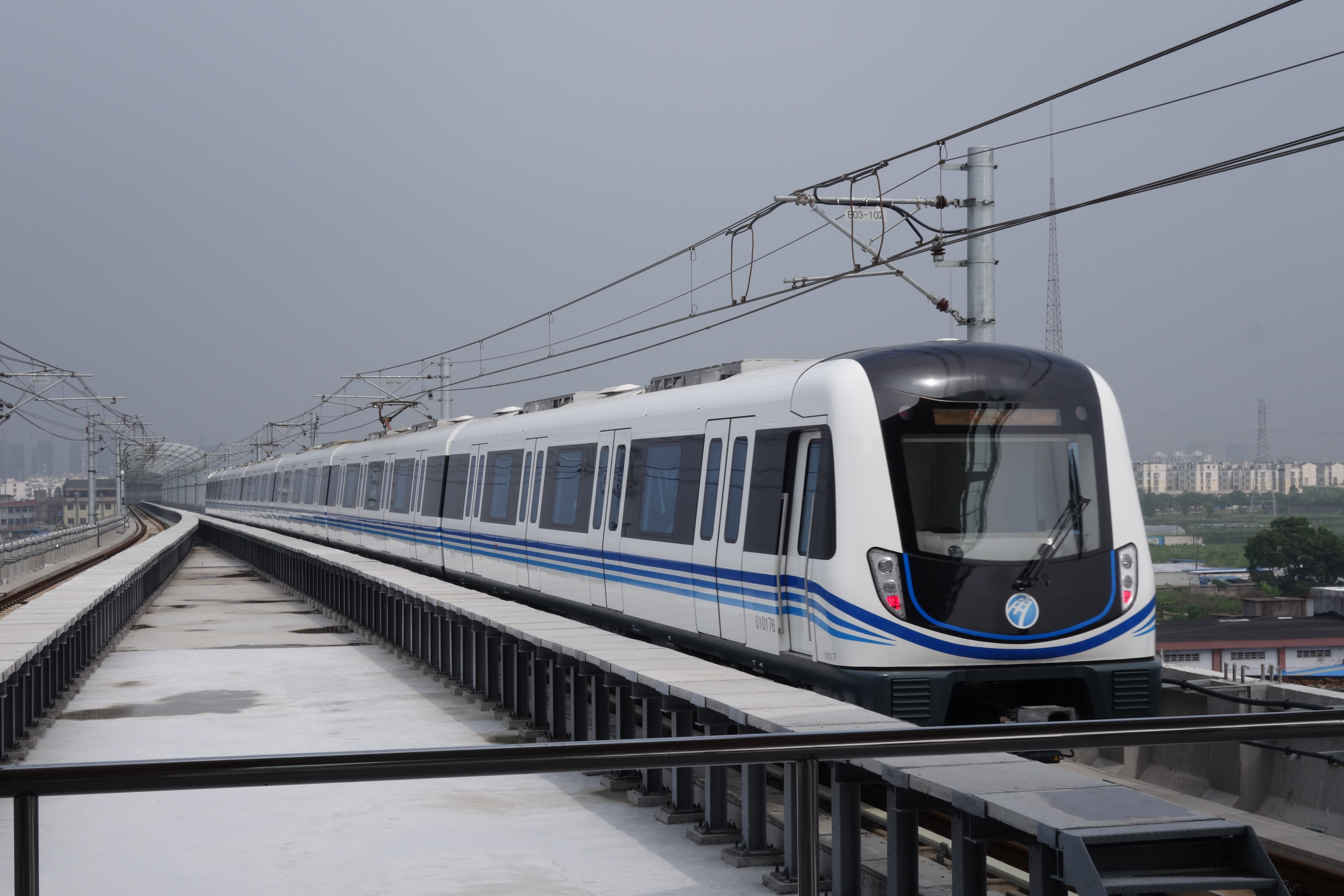

Overview
- Owner: Ningbo Rail Transit Group
- Locale: Ningbo, China
- Transit type: Rapid transit
- Number of lines: 9
- Number of stations: 210
- Daily ridership: 1,063,200 (2024)
- Annual ridership: 388 million (2024)
- Website: http://www.nbmetro.com/

Operation
- Began operation: May 30, 2014; 12 years ago
- Operators: Ningbo Rail Transit Co., Ltd.

Technical
- System length: 357.45 km (222.11 mi)
- Track gauge: 1,435 mm (4 ft 8 1/2 in)

Ningbo Rail Transit
- Simplified Chinese: 宁波轨道交通
- Traditional Chinese: 寧波軌道交通
Transcriptions
Standard Mandarin
- Hanyu Pinyin: Níngbō Guǐdào Jiāotōng

Ningbo Rail Transit, also known as the Ningbo Metro, is a rapid transit system serving the city of Ningbo, Zhejiang and its suburbs. As of September 2026, 9 metro lines are in operation inside the urban area of Ningbo, serving Haishu, Jiangbei, Zhenhai, Beilun and Yinzhou. The first phase of Line 1 started construction in June 2009 and began to service the public on May 30, 2014. Line 2 began service on September 26, 2015. Ningbo Rail Transit is the second rapid transit system in operation in Zhejiang Province, following the Hangzhou Metro.

== Lines in operation ==
As of September 2026, there are 9 lines in operation in the Ningbo Rail Transit system.

Line	Terminals (District)		Opening	Newest Extension	Length (km)	Stations
1	Gaoqiao West (Haishu)	Xiapu (Beilun)	May 30, 2014	March 19, 2016	46.165	29
2	Lishe International Airport (Haishu)	Honglian (Beilun)	September 26, 2015	December 1, 2022	36.95	27
3	Datong Bridge (Jiangbei)	Jinhai Road (Fenghua)	June 30, 2019	September 27, 2020	38.63	24
4	Cicheng West (Jiangbei)	International Conference Center (Yinzhou)	December 23, 2020	May 16, 2025	39.73	27
5	Buzheng (Haishu)	Luotuo Bridge (Zhenhai)	December 28, 2021	June 28, 2024	36.6	27
6	Gulin (Haishu)	Honglian (Beilun)	January 16, 2026		39.6	23
7	Yunlong (Yinzhou)	Yufan (Zhenhai)	August 29, 2025		39.4	25
8	Hansong Road (Yinzhou)	Kaiyuan Road (Jiangbei)	June 30, 2025		21.8	18
12	Xiaoyangjiang (Yinzhou)	Damuwan (Xiangshan County)	September 22, 2026		61.45	10
Total					357.45	210

=== Line 1 ===
Line 1 is the first metro line serving Ningbo. It stretches in the east–west direction, starting in the western town of Gaoqiao as a viaduct and turning into a tunnel as it approaches Haishu District. The tunnel stretches under Zhongshan Road, a main road in Ningbo, crossing the Fenghua River and entering Yinzhou District. It then passes Ningbo East New Town and the town of Qiuga, crossing eastward into Beilun District through China National Highway 329 via elevated line. It then follows Taishan Road to Xiapu Station, the easternmost destination. The construction of the section between Gaoqiao West and Donghuan South Road began in June 2009 and passenger service began on May 30, 2014, making Ningbo Metro Line 1 the second subway line in Zhejiang Province. The extension of Line 1 between Donghuan South Road and Xiapu began trial operations on March 19, 2016.

=== Line 2 ===
Line 2 is the second metro line in Ningbo. It starts near Ningbo Lishe International Airport and stretches eastwards through tunnels. After reaching Yage'er Avenue it turns northwards and passes Ningbo Textile City, after which the route zigzags into Ningbo Coach Center and crosses Ningbo railway station eastwards, the main railway station of the city. The route extends northwards into Jiangbei District and turns eastwards until it reaches Lulin Market, where it turns into viaducts before reaching Qingshuipu station in Zhenhai District. This section of Line 2 opened on September 26, 2015. The line was later extended to Honglian station which opened on December 1, 2022.

=== Line 3 ===
Line 3 is the third metro line in Ningbo. It starts in Fenghua as an elevated line and goes northwards and then goes eastwards and turns into an underground route and enters Chenpodu area in Yinzhou District. Then it goes northwards into Yinzhou Central Area via Ningnan South Road and then turns into Songjiang Middle Road and goes northeast until it reaches the Ningbo–Taizhou–Wenzhou railway and go into Jiangdong District via Zhongxing Road. Finally it crosses Yong River and reaches Datong Bridge Station, the terminal of Phase I. The line will be extended further into Luotuo Town, Zhenhai District.

=== Line 4 ===
Line 4 starts from Cicheng Station in Cicheng Town and turns south into the North External Ring Viaduct where it turns east–west. After reaching Jiangbei Avenue, it starts to turn underground and deviates from the viaduct to Zhuangqiao railway station where it turns south, crosses Yaojiang River and reaches Ningbo railway station. Then Line 4 goes along Changchun Road, Xingning Road until it reaches Canghai Road and become north–south again. After reaching Shounan Road it turns into southeast direction and reaches Dongqian Lake, its destination.

=== Line 5 ===
Line 5 starts from Buzheng Station in western Yinzhou District as an underground line. Then it goes along Yinxian Road and passes the Fenghua River until it reaches Xiaying and turns north. Then the line goes along first Haiyan Road and then Yuanshi Road. Then the line passes the Yong River and reaches its destination, Xingzhuang Road Station.

== Lines under construction and under planning ==
In December 2020, the "2021-2026 Construction Plan of Ningbo Rail Transit" was approved by NDRC. The plan includes first phase of Lines 6, 7 and 8 as well as extensions to Line 1 and 4, totaling 106.5 km of new lines. Additionally, late stage planning work is underway on two regional express metro lines to Cixi and Xiangshan.

Years	Line	Terminals (District)		Length (km)	Stations	Status
Before 2026	8 (Phase I, Xiaying South part)	Xiaying South	Hansong Road	1.24	1	Under Construction
Before 2026	1 (West extension)	Gaoqiao West	Shilutou	1.5	1	Approved
2026	10 (Ningci Line)	Kongpu	Cixi Railway Station	63.6	13	Under Construction

== Rolling stock ==
CSR Zhuzhou provides 22 six-car trains for Line 1. Some trains are assembled in Ningbo locally.
