= Xiapu station (Ningbo Rail Transit) =

Metro station in Ningbo, China

Coordinates: 29.8905°N 121.8569°E

Xiapu 霞浦
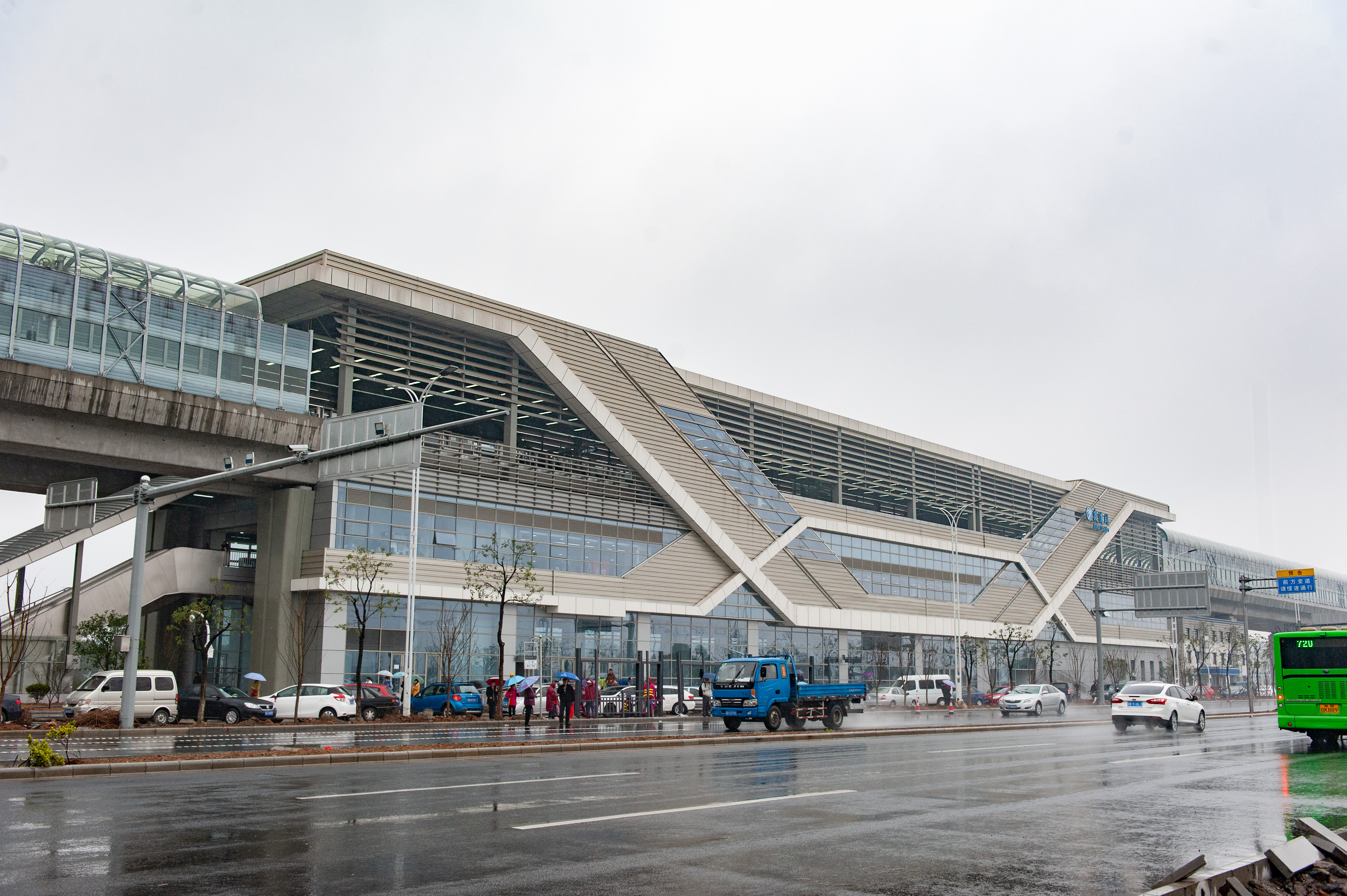

General information
- Location: Beilun District, Ningbo, Zhejiang; China
- Operated by: Ningbo Rail Transit Co. Ltd.
- Line(s): Line 1
- Platforms: 2 (1 island platform)

Construction
- Structure type: Elevated

History
- Opened: 19 March 2016

Services
Preceding station	Ningbo Rail Transit	Following station
Changjiang Road towards Gaoqiao West	Line 1	Terminus

Xiapu Station (Chinese: 霞浦站; pinyin: Xiápǔ Zhàn) is an elevated metro station in Ningbo, Zhejiang, China. Xiapu Station is located on Taishan Road. Construction of the station started in December 2012, and service began on March 19, 2016.

== Exits ==
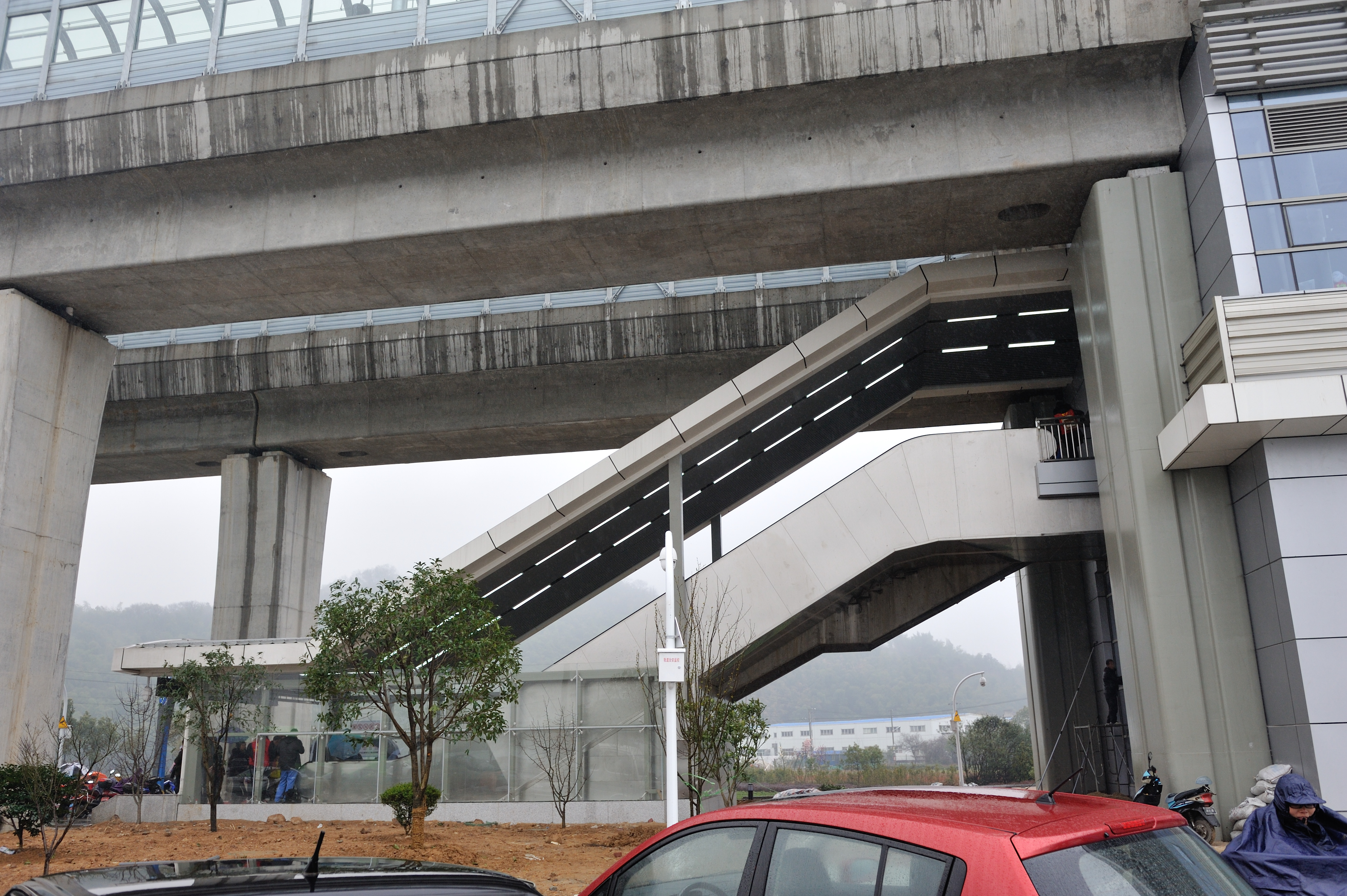
Exit A, Xiapu Station

Xiapu Station has one exit.

No	Suggested destinations
A	Taishan Road
