= Imperial Library =

Imperial Library may refer to:

- Imperial Library of Constantinople
- Various libraries maintained by imperial households of China
  - Wenjin Chamber
  - Wenlan Chamber
  - Wenyuan Chamber
- Former name of the National Library of India
- Imperial Library (Japan), predecessor institution of the National Diet Library
- Library of Trantor, a fictional galactic repository in the works of Isaac Asimov
