= Ximenkou Station =

Ximenkou Station may refer to:

- Ximenkou Station (Guangzhou), on Line 1, Guangzhou Metro, China
- Ximenkou Station (Ningbo), on Line 1, Ningbo Rail Transit, China
