= Tianyi Ge =

Private library in China

Coordinates: 29.872643°N 121.535506°E

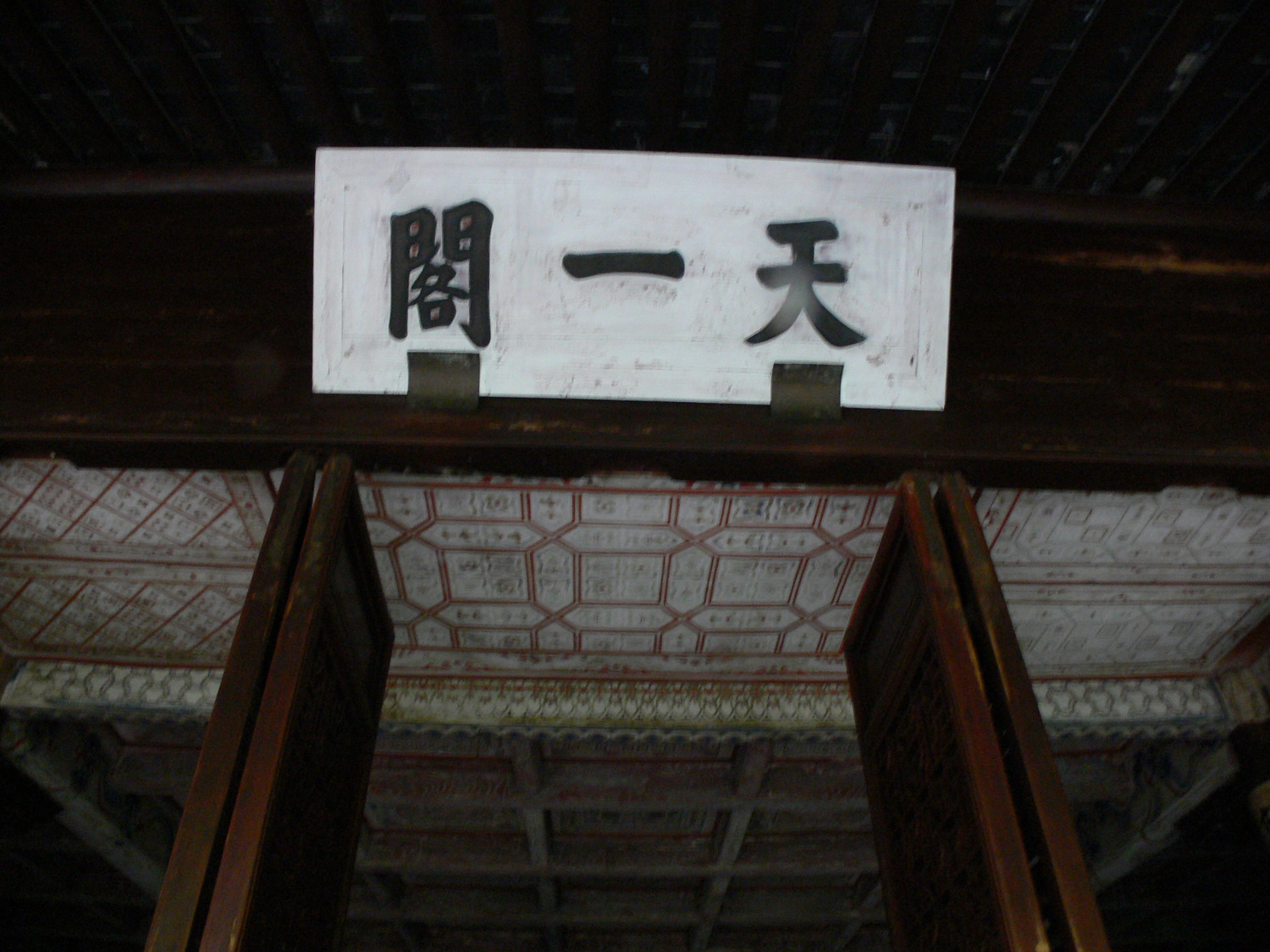
Tianyi Ge inscription board

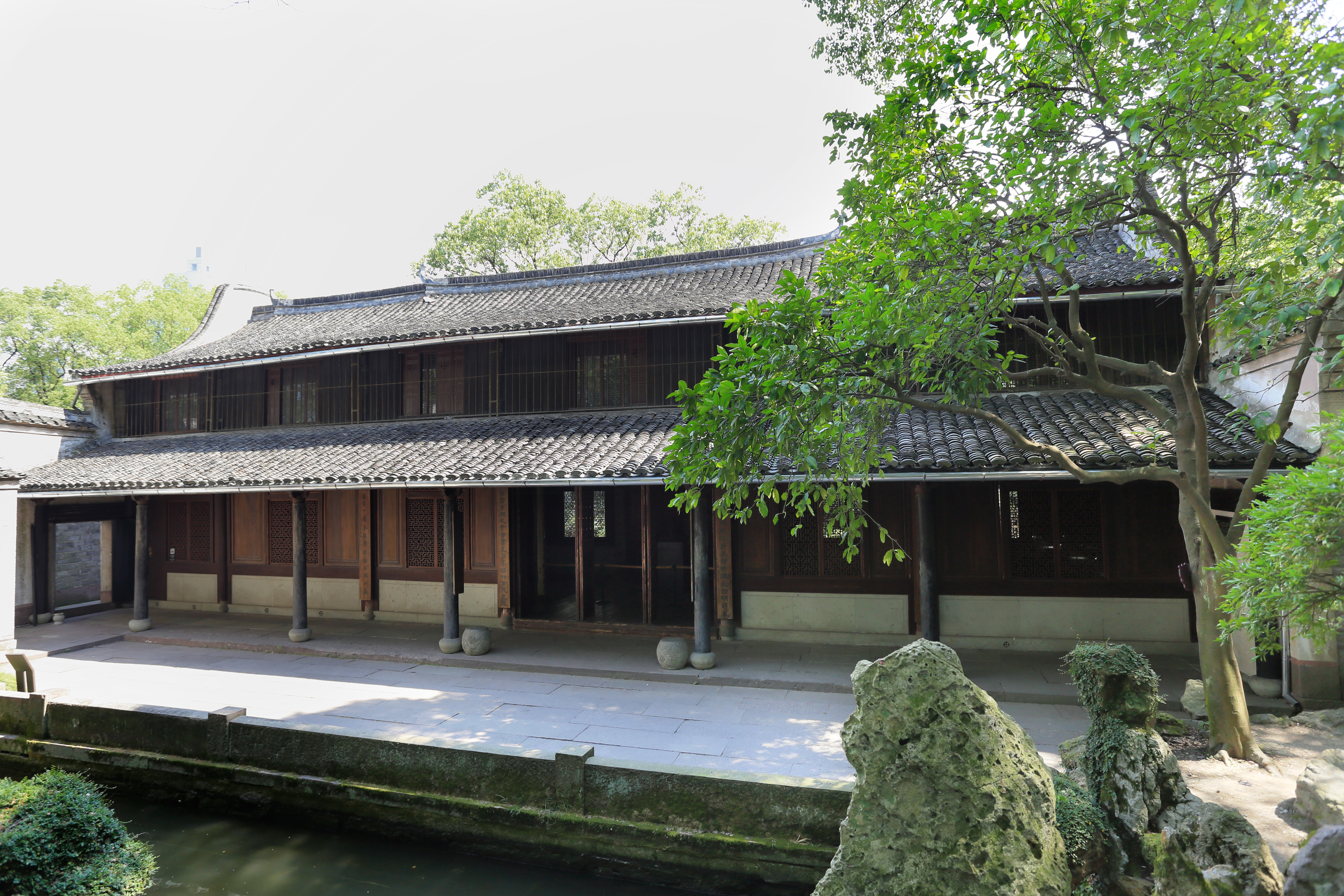
Tianyi Ge

The Tianyi Ge (Chinese: 天一閣; pinyin: Tiān Yī Gé; lit. 'One Sky Pavilion'), translated as Tianyi Pavilion or Tianyi Chamber, is a library and garden located in Ningbo, Zhejiang Province, China.

== Background ==
=== Establishment ===
Tianyi Ge was built in 1561 during the 40th year of the Jiajing reign of the Ming Dynasty by Fan Qin. He was passionate about reading and got "Jinshi" in 1532, a title given to candidates who successfully passed the highest and most prestigious level of the imperial examination in ancient China. He was also an official in the Ministry of Military Affairs. Tianyi Ge collected many valuable books and classics, and it also influenced how other libraries were built later on. During its peak, Tianyi Ge had over 70,000 volumes, but because of issues like corruption, theft, and damage over time, only 13,000 books are left in the 1940s. After the People's Republic of China was established, the number of books increased to 300,000 thanks to inspections and donations.

The name Tian Yi' refers to the concept of cosmic unity first described in a Han dynasty commentary to the Book of Changes. In Chinese alchemy Tianyi is linked to the element of water, thus it was believed by providing a watery name would protect the library against fire damage.

=== Inheritance and development ===
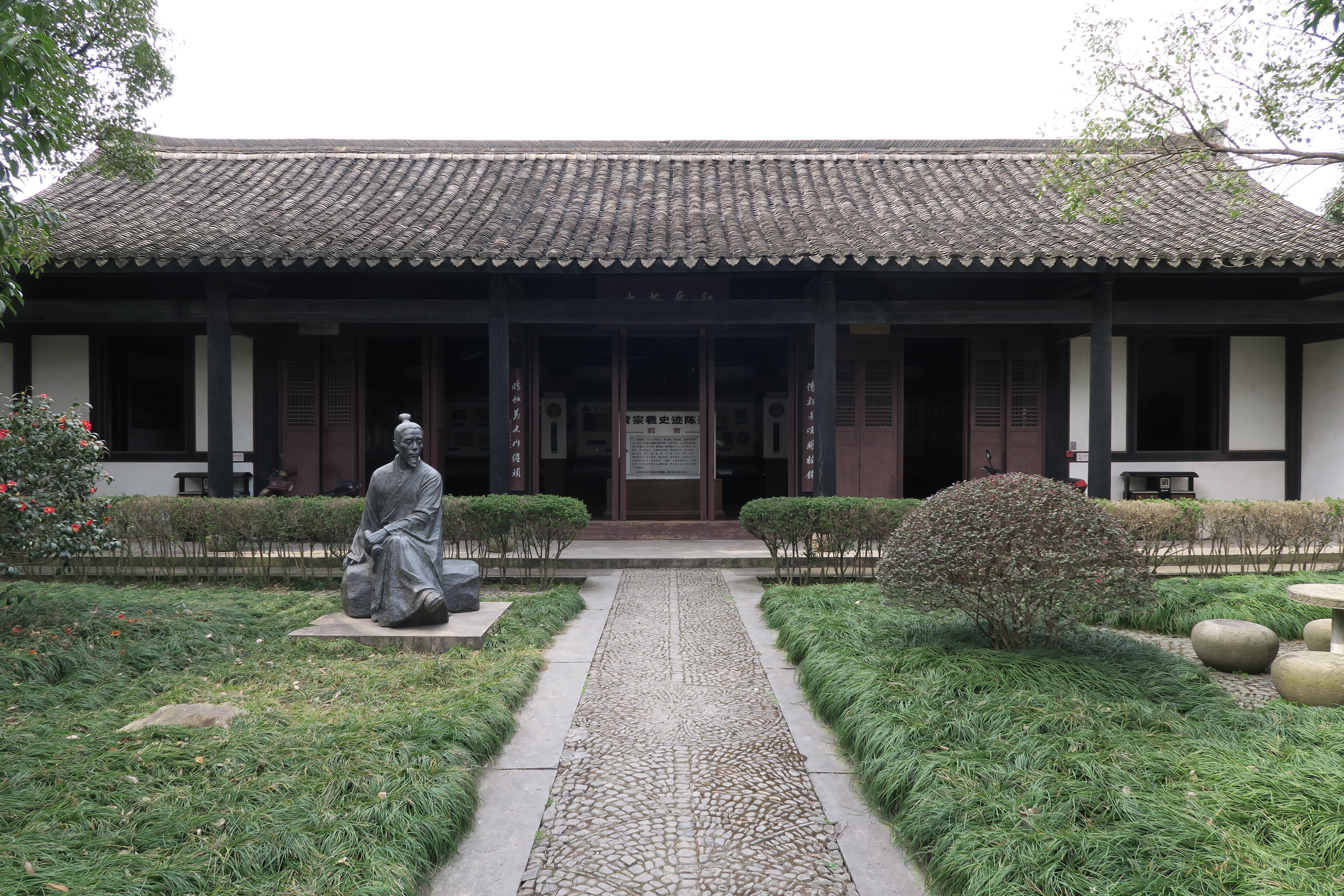
Huang Zongxi

In 1676, Fan Qin's descendants (1585 AD) passed out more than one hundred kinds of books to scholars for reading. He approved the famous scholar Huang Zongxi to go upstairs to read the Tianyige library books. Huang Zongxi became the first foreigner to enter Tianyi Pavilion. Huang Zongxi prepared a bibliography for Tianyi Pavilion and writes "Records of the collection in Tianyi Pavilion".

Documented in the book of Huang Zongxi that: Fan Qin divided his family property into two parts prior, the collection of books and other family production. The eldest son volunteered to abandon the inheritance rights of other family property, and inherited more than 70,000 volumes of books collected by his father. While the Fan's descendants maintained and supplemented the Tianyige collection, they also established ethnic rules that maintain the Tianyige collection, which stipulates that the books are shared by children and grandchildren.

The Qianlong Emperor of the Qing dynasty visited Tianyi Ge and instructed officials to create schematics of its building plans and bookcases as a prototype. These plans were then used to construct several imperial libraries, including Wenyuan Ge in the Forbidden City, and Wenjin Ge in the Chengde Mountain Resort, which would house the Complete Library of the Four Treasuries encyclopedia.

=== Losses and modern restoration ===
After the Second Opium War (1856–1860), the British took many books from the library's collection of geography and history texts. These losses were followed by further thefts by local thieves. By 1940, the collection dwindled to less than 20,000 volumes.

After the founding of the People's Republic of China, due to governmental effort and donations by private collectors, the collection recovered somewhat to about 30,000 volumes, mostly rare antique Ming dynasty printed and hand copied volumes.

In 1982, Tianyi Ge was established by the Chinese authorities as a National Heritage Site. The Qin Family Drama Stage is also located in the complex.

The restoration techniques of ancient books at Tianyi Ge have been better preserved and promoted. In 2009, Tianyi Ge was recognized as "National-Level Ancient Book Restoration Centers." In 2021, the book restoration techniques of Tianyi Ge were included in the list of National Intangible Cultural Heritage projects. Today, Tianyi Ge restores over 10,000 damaged book leaves annually and has trained more than 100 restoration personnel from across the country.

== Position and incorporation ==
=== Geographical location and Open Times ===
Tianyi Ge Historic District is located in the middle and western part of the historical street of Yuehu West Street in the old city of Ningbo. In the cultural undertakings of the feudal Chinese in the Ming dynasty (1368-1644 AD), Wen Yuan's "Tiangong Parterre" has been incorporated into Tianyi Ge and transformed into "East Garden" as part of the garden. Tianyi Ge is part of the residential area of the Fan Family and the entire area of the traditional structure of the street and the alley has disappeared. It consists of three parts: West Park, South Park and East Park.Tianyi Ge is closed on Monday morning(except public holiday, when it open at 1:30 PM). From Tuesday to Sunday, it is open from 8:30 AM to 5:00 PM, with entry stopping 30 minutes before closing.

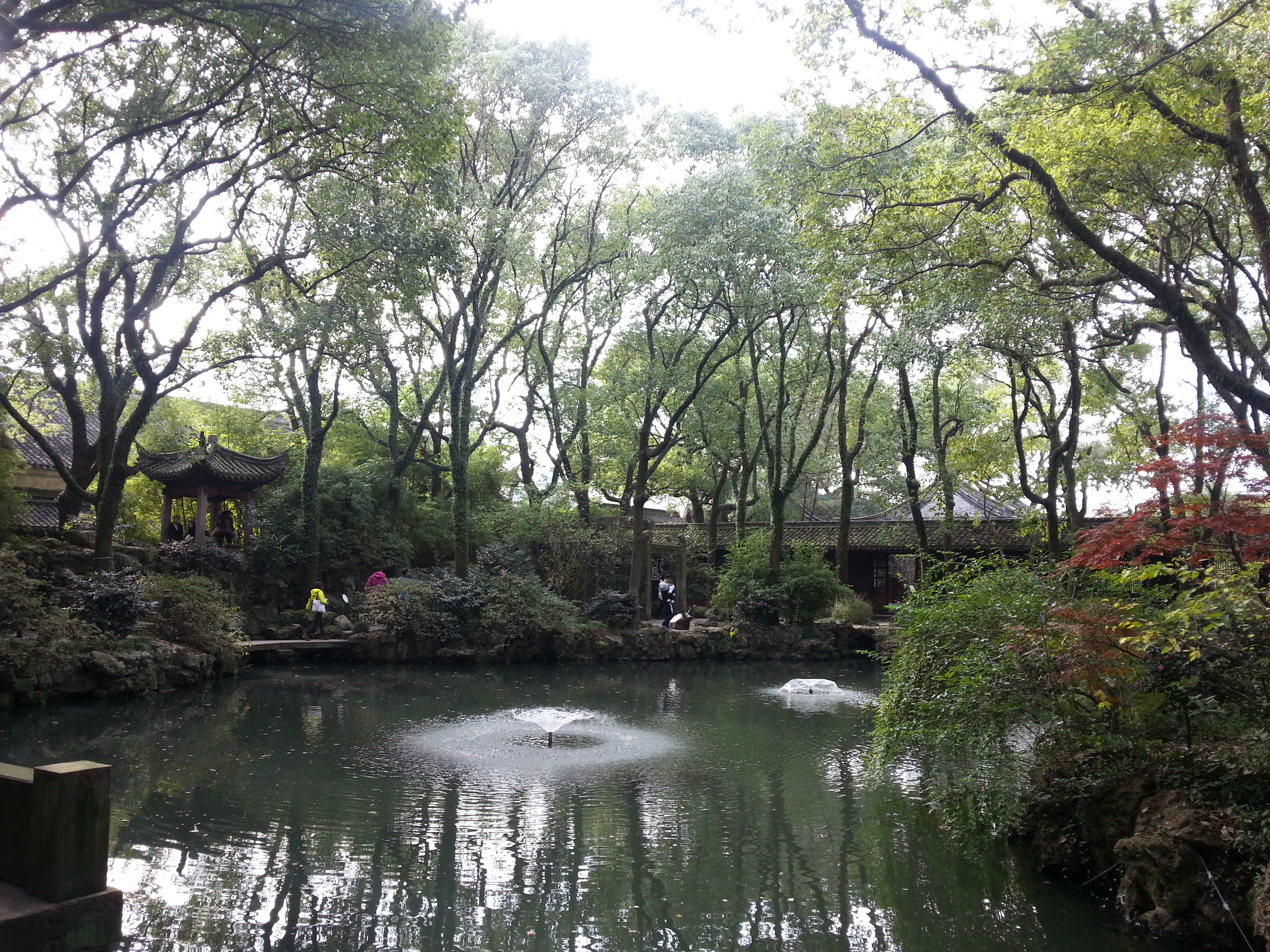
Tianyi Ge Garden

=== Incorporation Traditional Architecture and Features ===
Since 1989, the ancestral halls along the roads such as Qinjiatang, Wen's family temple, Chen family museum, and some factory buildings have been incorporated into Tianyi Ge and have become a showcase of traditional culture. The area of Tianyi Ge has reached the peak including the main body of the museum (library), the garden and the traditional architecture. The Tianyi Ge faces north to south and is a two-story wooden structure with a hard mountain-style roof. It stands 8.5 meters tall, with a slanted roof covered in blue tiles. The first floor is divided into several rooms, while the second floor has an open space apart from the staircase, separated by bookshelves. In front of the library is the “Tianyi Pond,” surrounded by a garden designed with elements symbolizing “blessings, wealth, and longevity,” along with scenic spots like the “Nine Lions and One Elephant” made from stacked stones. Tianyi Pavilion and its surrounding gardens showcase the style of traditional Jiangnan courtyard gardens. The library's collection and architectural style provide valuable resources for studying book storage methods, local history, stone carvings, stone architecture, and residential structures of the Zhejiang region.

== Technological and Cultural Contributions ==
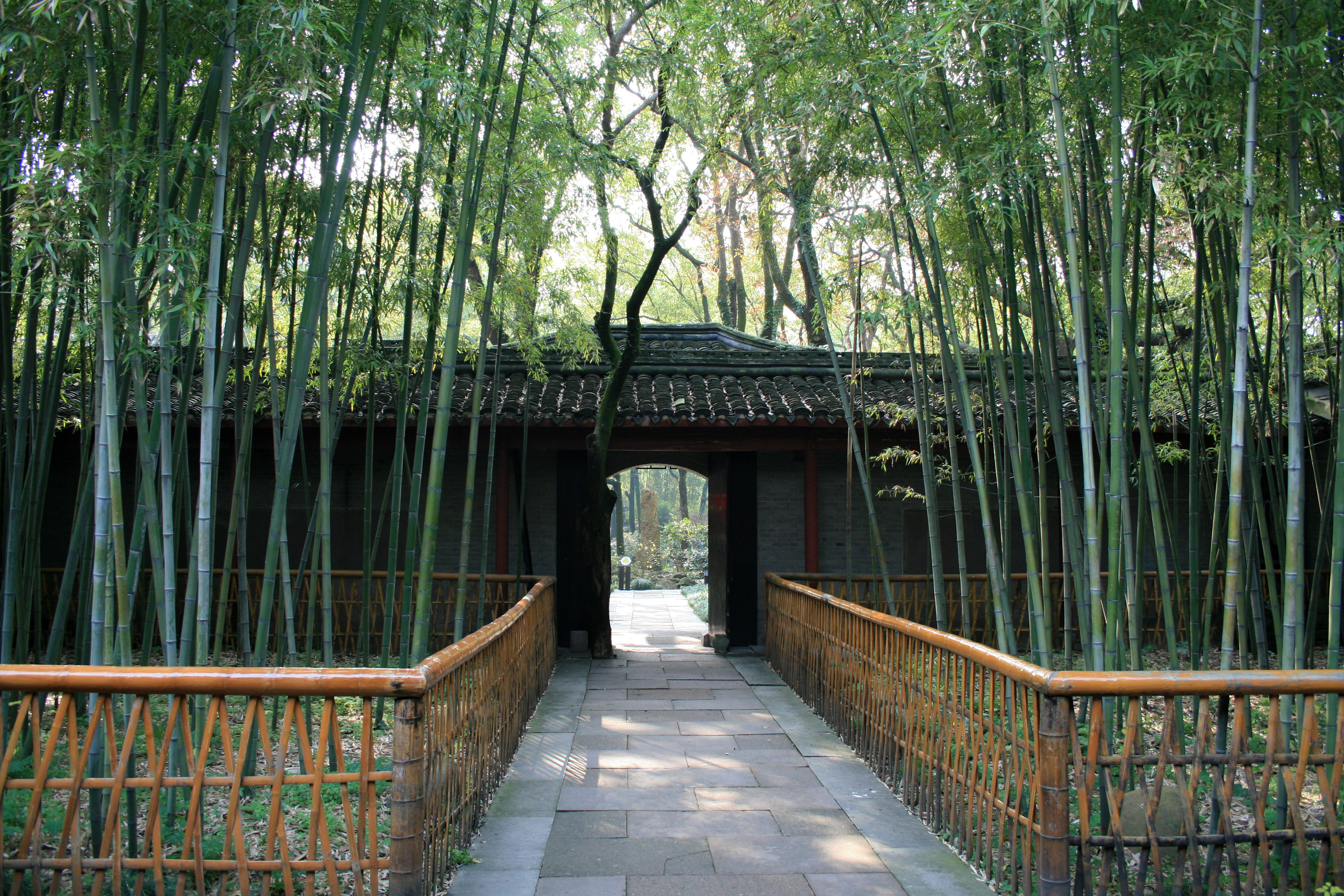
Bamboo forest in Tianyi Pavilion

=== Technical improvements in paper production ===
Cheap bamboo papermaking. The bamboo paper is made from pulpy bamboo shoots (Phyllostachys aurea), a widely planted plant in China that has been a major source of papermaking fibers since the 8th century. Paper is traditionally made using natural materials, hand tools, utensils and naturally occurring reagents. This technology had further improved in the Ming dynasty (1368-1644 AD). Song Yingxing (1587–1666 AD) documented the work rolled up by the gradual process of this manufacture in his book Tian Gung Kai Wu (The Exploitation of the Works of Nature).

=== Woodblock printing (wood engraving) ===
Since the typography invention of movable type printing in the Song dynasty of China, printing technology had continued to develop. In the late Yuan dynasty, Wang Zhen invented wooden printing. Compared with muddy characters, the resistance of wood type to external forces was better. By the Ming dynasty (1368-1644 AD), printing technology reached another peak. Chinese printers were able to produce illustrations of various colors, displaying various shades of colors and contrasting colors, imitating the hands of Chinese masters of calligraphy and painting. At the time, the artists' printers discovered and developed this technology, adding a strong color to their books

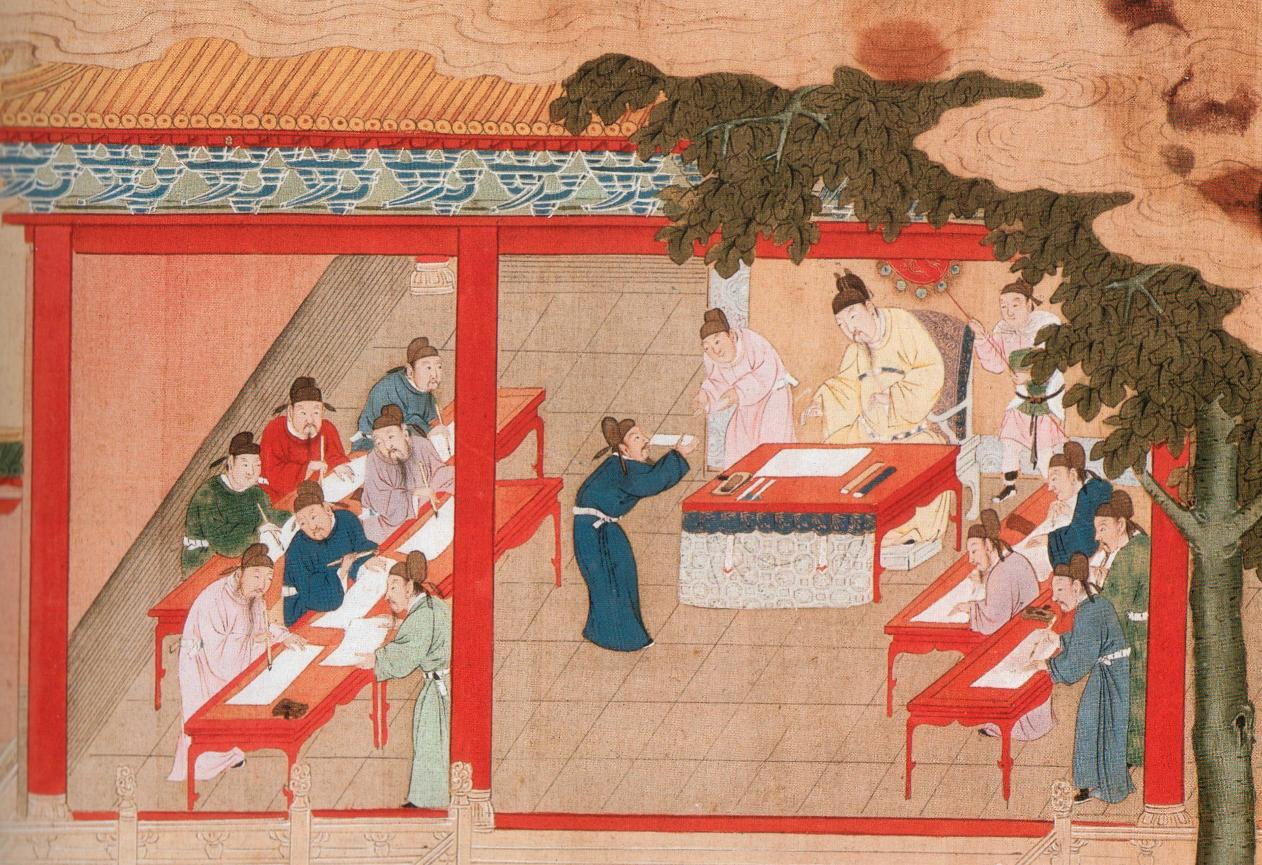
Palace Examination

=== Cultural expansion and social transformation in the 15th century ===
The development of urbanization that began gradually in the Song dynasty(1587–1666 AD) began to take shape in the Ming dynasty (1368-1644 AD), and commercialization and the sprouting of capitalism also appeared at that time. At the same time, the literacy rate and educational development have also been further improved during the Ming dynasty(1368-1644 AD).

The increasing availability and low cost of books had promoted the popularity of literacy. The examination exam had been canceled since the Yuan dynasty (1271–1368 AD) and had ushered in a new climax in the Ming dynasty (1368-1644 AD). The examination scale was increasing. Publishers responded to the growing number of examination candidates to print brochures. Successful model exams were popular and widely available. A wide variety of books, ranging from cheap versions of popular novels to expensive reprints of classics have a wealth of content. The novels of the Ming and Qing dynasties( 1644-1912AD) represented the pinnacle of Chinese classical novels. Three of the four famous novels in China were completed and widely circulated in the Ming dynasty. From another perspective, it also illustrated the importance and prosperity of culture and books received in the Ming dynasty (1368-1644 AD). The possession of books increasingly tended to define social status. Collection books had also gained a powerful boost from publishing. As the books became cheaper, the number and scale of private libraries grew during the late Ming and early Qing dynasties (1644-1912AD). A collection of several thousand juan (bound chapters or volumes) were considered worthy of respect, and 10,000 juan (equivalent to one thousand titles) were significant. Libraries with about 30,000 juan were not uncommon. On Fan Qin's death (1585 AD), Tianyi Pavilion contained over 70 thousand juan, with several thousand titles.

== The importance of Tianyi Ge ==
=== The Architectural Significance of Tianyi Ge ===
The architecture of Tianyi Ge reflects both practical and aesthetic considerations. The design includes features to protect the books from fire and moisture, such as fireproof materials and a strategic layout to ensure safety. The building also includes artistic elements, such as a garden that adds to the site’s overall beauty. This combination of practicality and artfulness makes Tianyi Ge an example of Chinese architectural design that integrates functionality with cultural symbolism.

=== Tianyi Ge’s Influence on Other Libraries ===
Tianyi Ge has had a profound impact on the development of private libraries, particularly in Zhejiang. Its design and book management practices have served as a model for other library builders in the region. During the Qing dynasty, Tianyi Ge gained further recognition through the imperial "Four Libraries" project, establishing it as a model for preserving and managing book collections. Scholars who visited Tianyi Ge, such as Yuan Yao, contributed to compiling the library’s catalog, ensuring that its academic significance was passed on to future generations.

=== Cultural Preservation and the Enduring Influence of Tianyi Ge ===
Tianyi Ge is a symbol of the cultural and intellectual legacy of Zhejiang. It played a crucial role in preserving important historical documents and scholarly works, ensuring that Chinese cultural heritage was passed down through generations. The library’s impact on the scholarly community is profound, with its collections becoming essential resources for research in Chinese culture, history, and politics. Its enduring influence continues to inspire scholars and bibliophiles worldwide, ensuring that the preservation of cultural knowledge remains a priority for future generations.

== Preservation and Restoration ==
=== Fire prevention ===
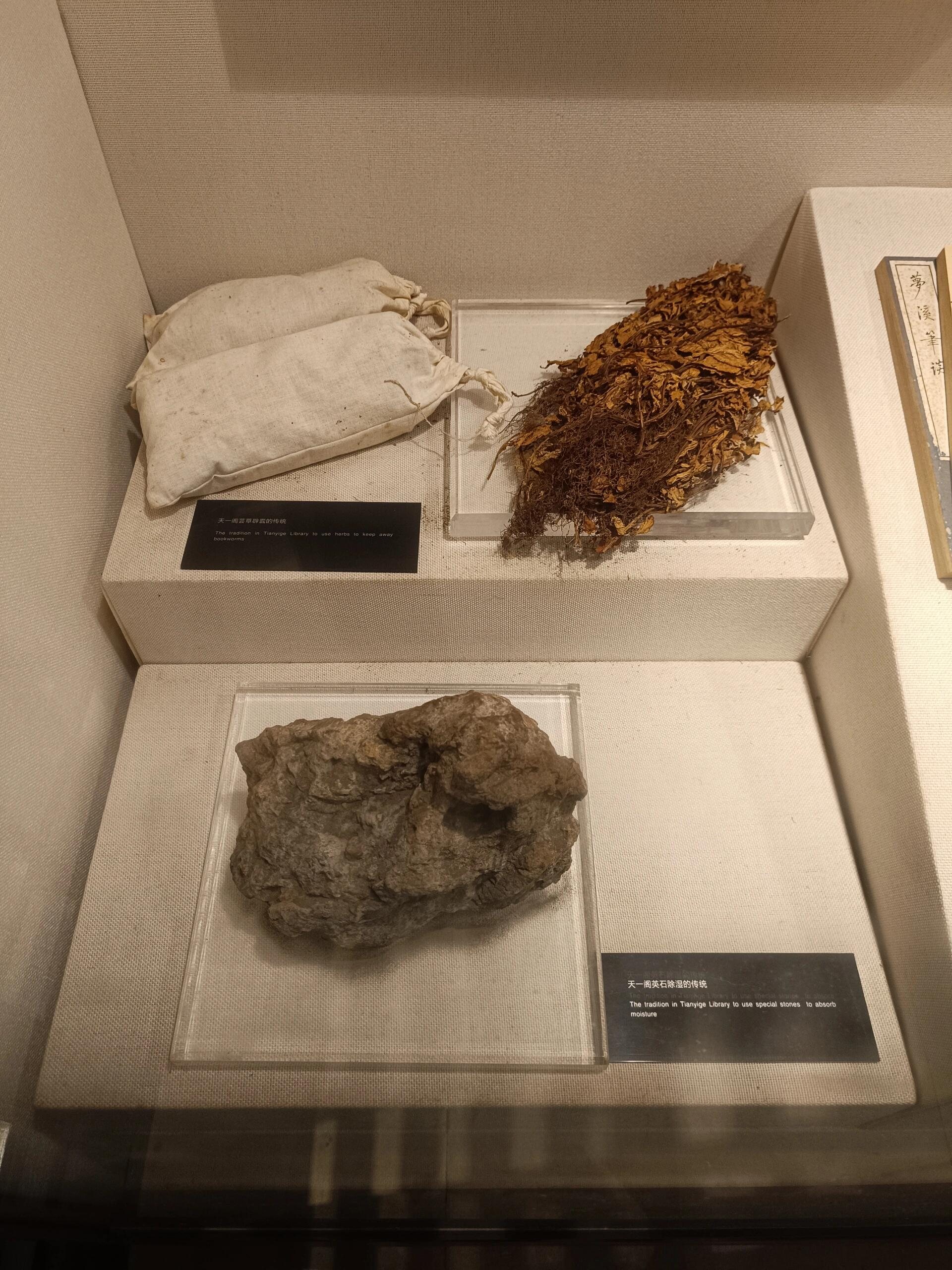

In ancient times, fire prevention was crucial for preserving libraries, and water served as an essential ally in safeguarding these invaluable collections. The design of Tianyi Pavilion ingeniously weaves this idea into its structure. The upper level, named "Tianyi" (Heavenly Unity), symbolizes the heavens, while the lower level is divided into six sections, representing the earth's six directions and suggesting that "Heaven creates water, and Earth sustains it." This symbolic design creates a natural barrier against fire, effectively protecting the pavilion's precious texts.

Tianyi Ge is not merely an architectural feat but a testament to ancient wisdom. Its design embodies a balance of practicality and cultural symbolism, a careful harmony of form and function that has quietly guarded knowledge across centuries.Non-combustible materials were introduced into some key building components. For instance, using clay to wrap wood structures. Non-combustible masonry could be used to create partitions between two adjacent buildings and set fire doors in certain key locations. In addition, the pool in the library could serve as a fire tank for fire protection.

Cangshulou is the Tianyi Ge library. It is a two-story building with double eaves and a gable roof, facing north and south.The design of the surroundings of the Baoshu Building reflects many details of fire prevention. The living area on the west side is separated from the library by a firewall, maintaining a certain position and staggering the doors of the two. There are a large number of emergency exits around the library. A pool was built in front of the library to store water in case of fire. According to legend, the water in this pool is connected to the Yue Lake, so the water is constantly flowing.

=== Update and preservation ===
1933–1934: Tianyi Pavilion was restored and refurbished, and the front and back yards of the library were added.

1982: Newly built a room for stacking cargo. Tianyi Ge experienced a new period of expansion. It is considered as a cultural heritage site that has been under national protection.

== Gallery ==
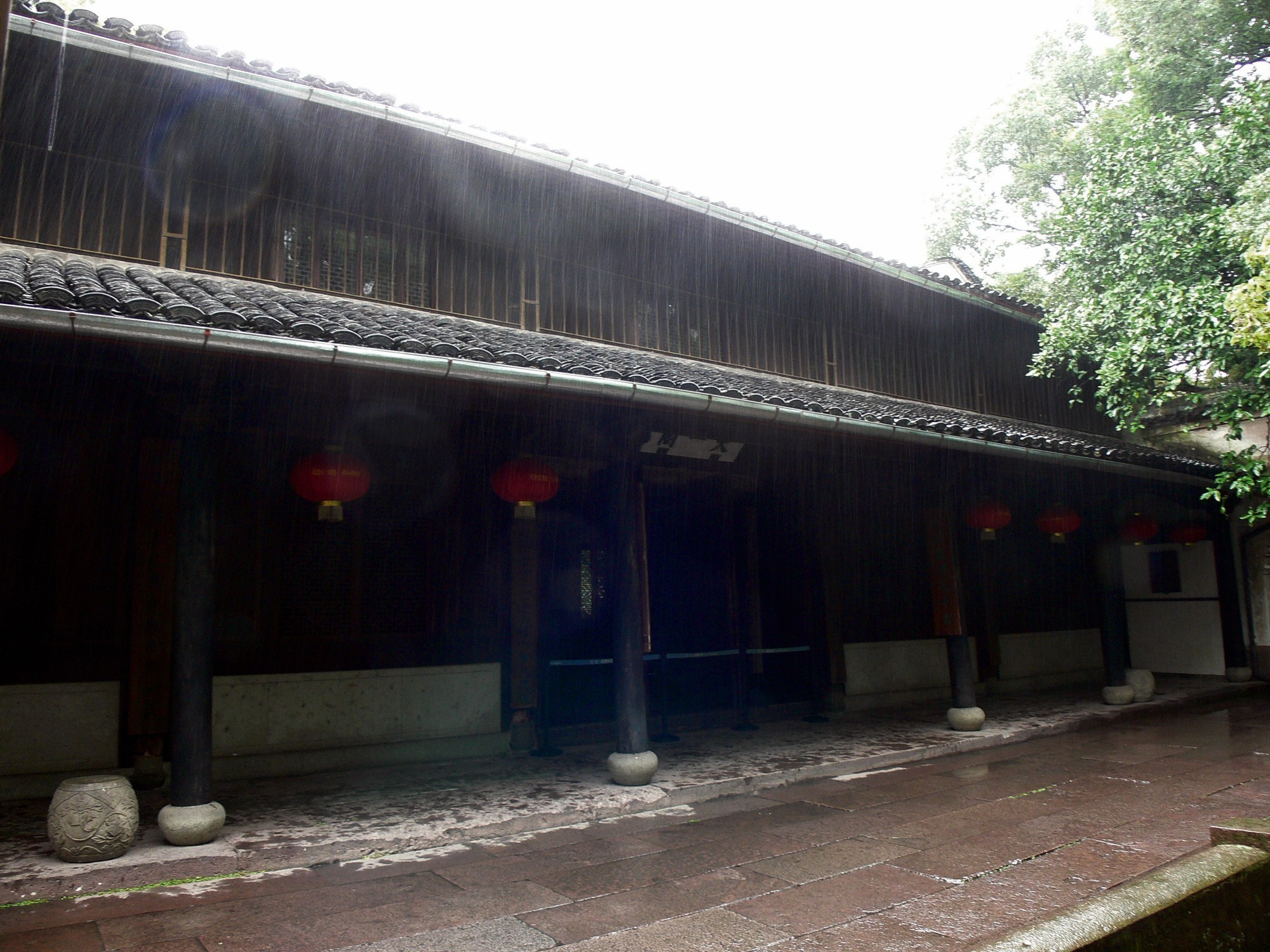
Tianyi Chamber library

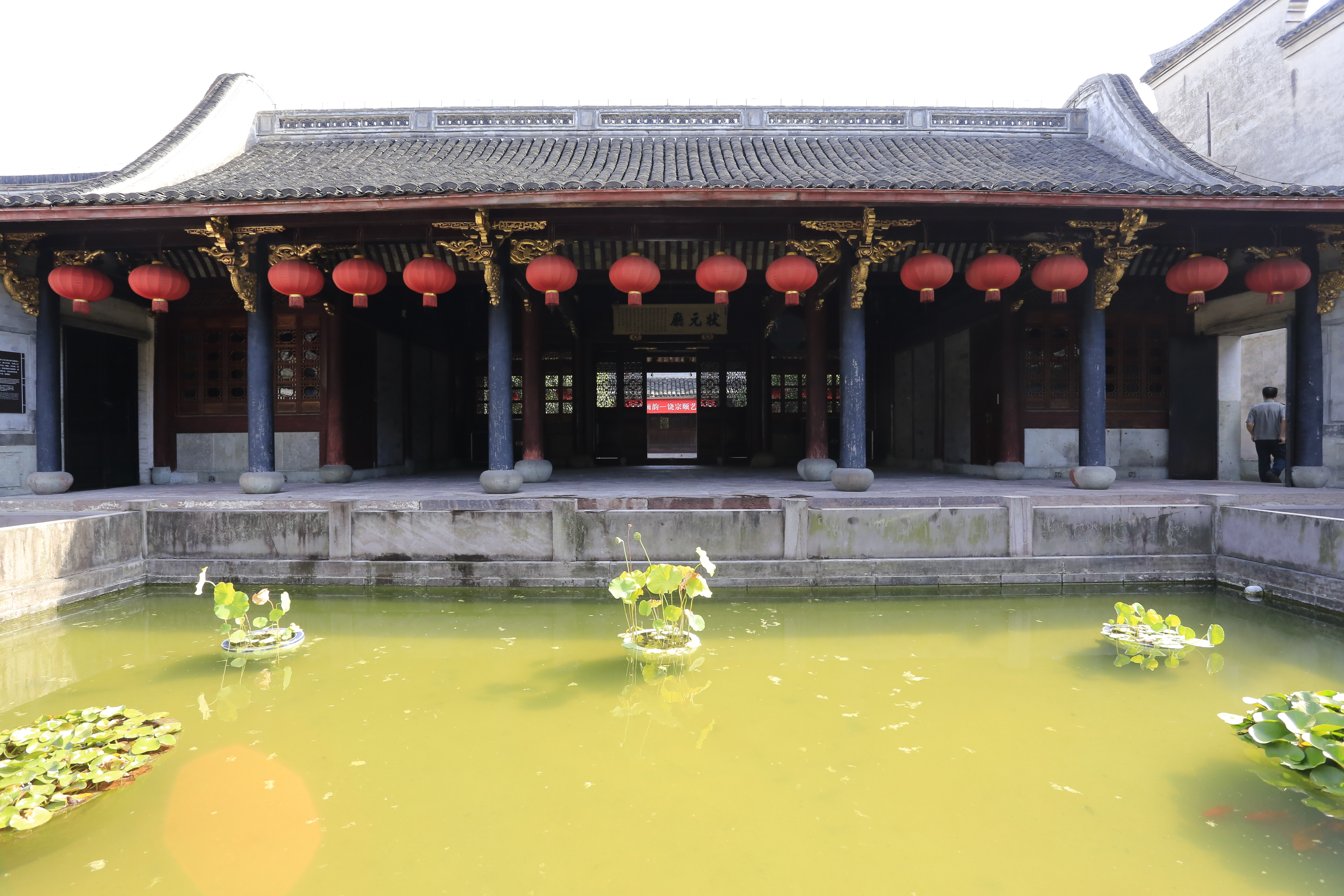
The Zhuangyuan Hall located within the Tianyi Ge compound

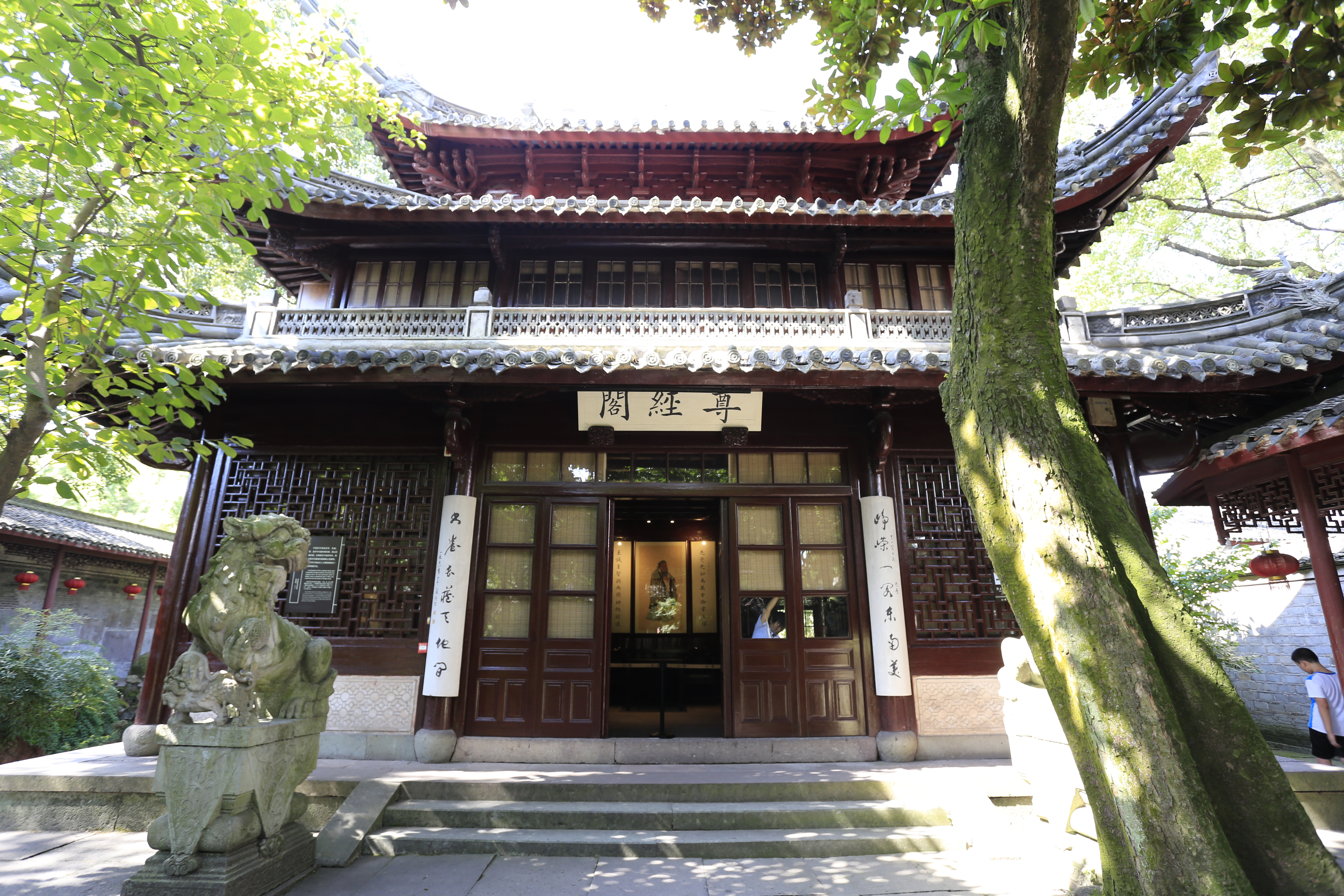
The Zunjing Hall located within the Tianyi Ge

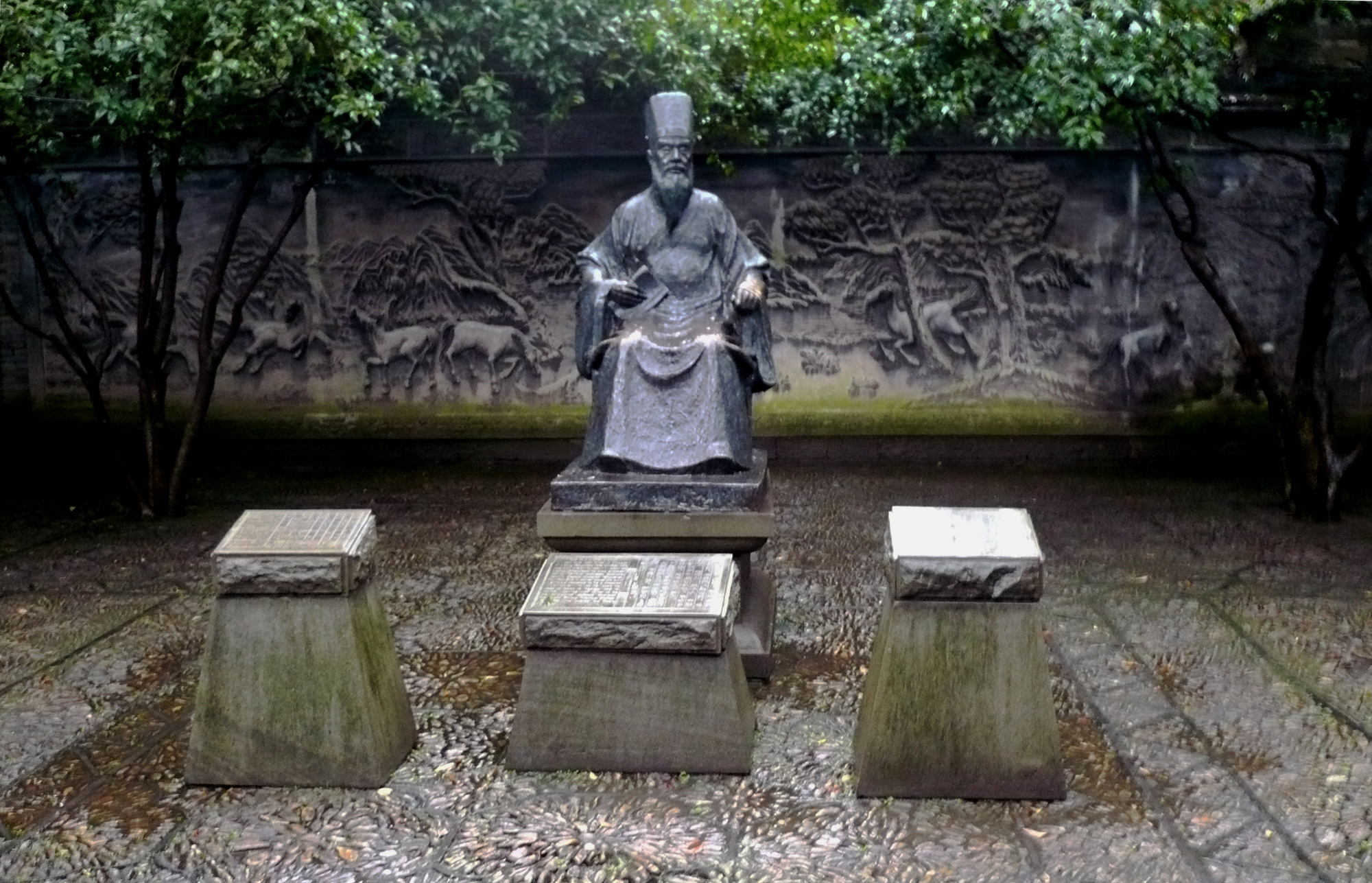
Statue of Fan Qin, the founder of the chamber

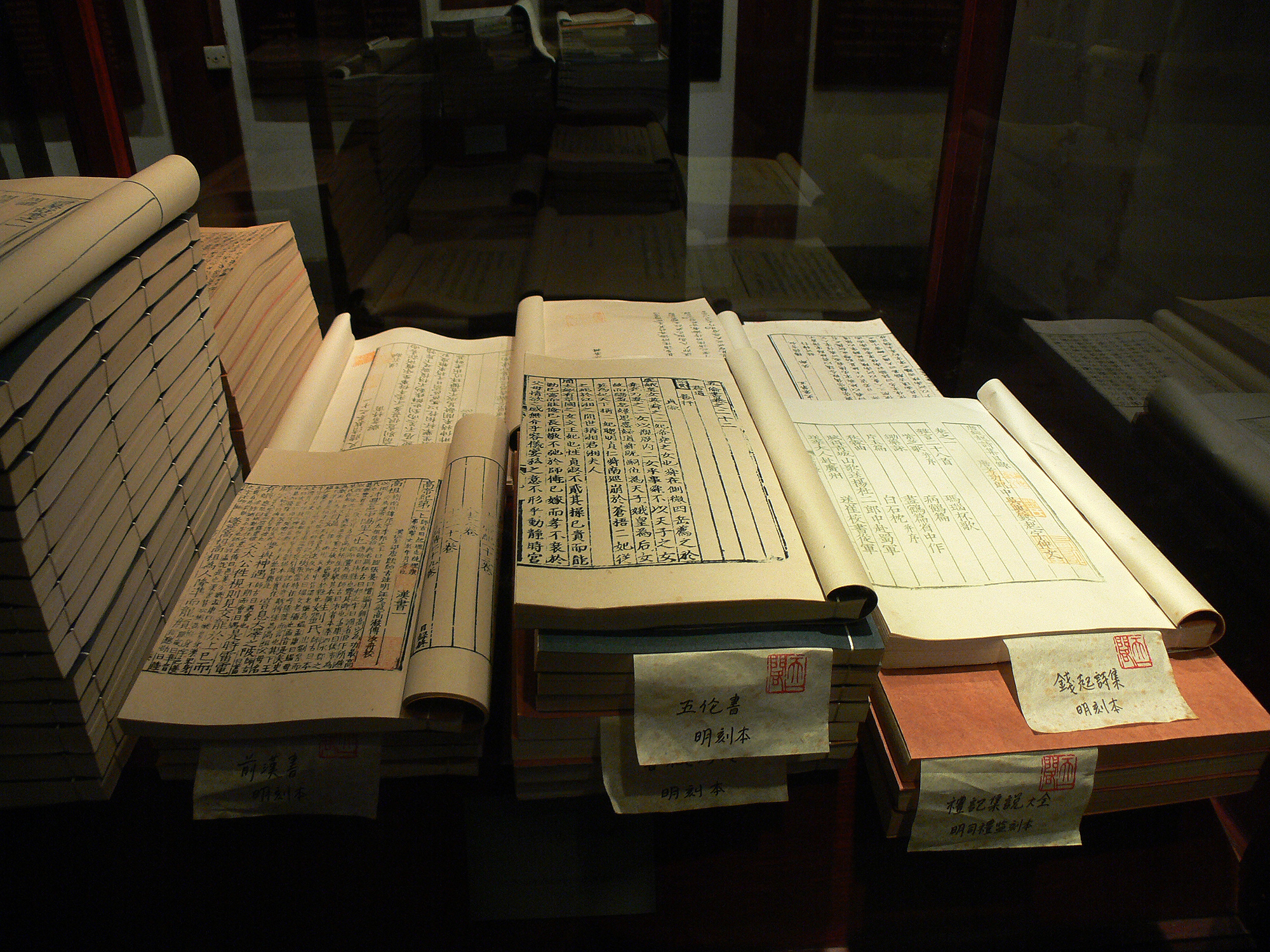
Ming dynasty antique books in Tianyi Chamber collection

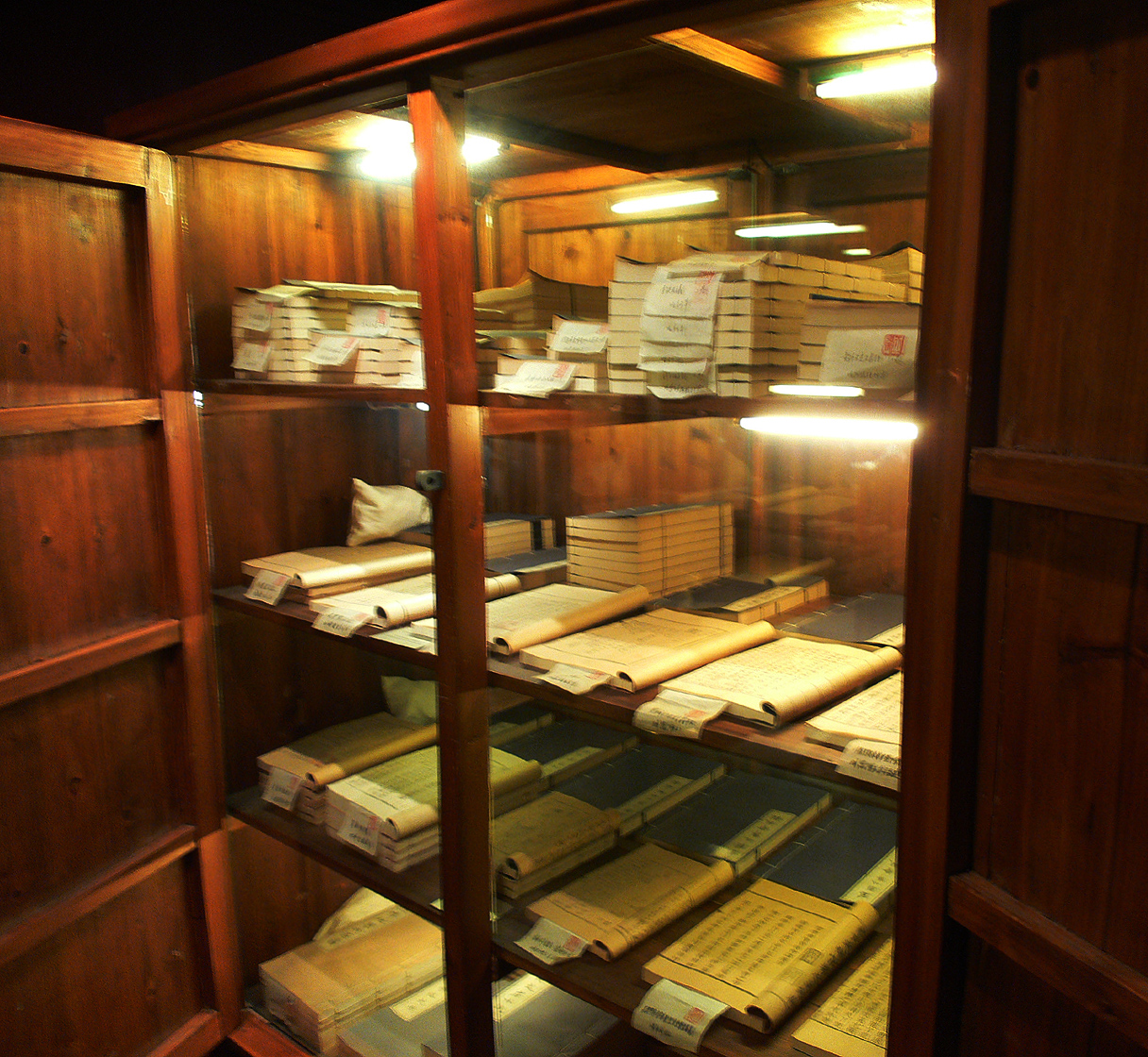
Tianyi Chamber book case

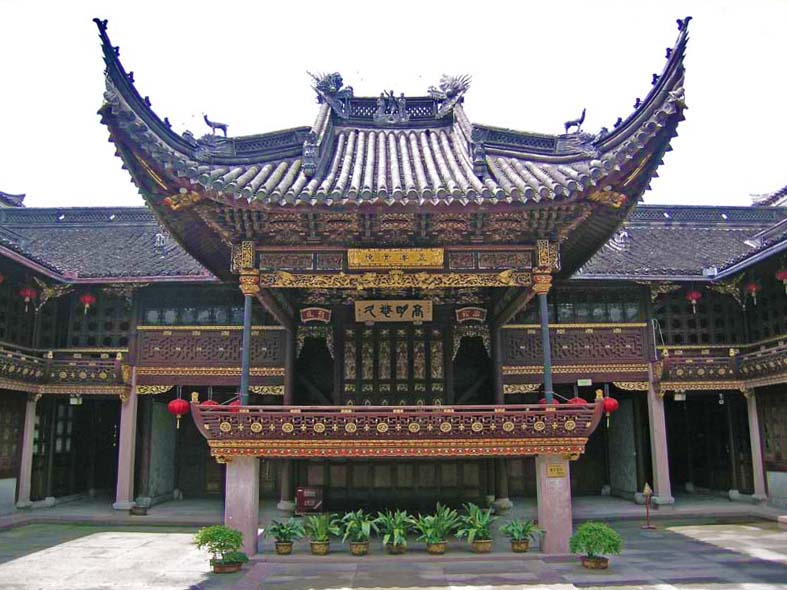
Qin family Drama Stage

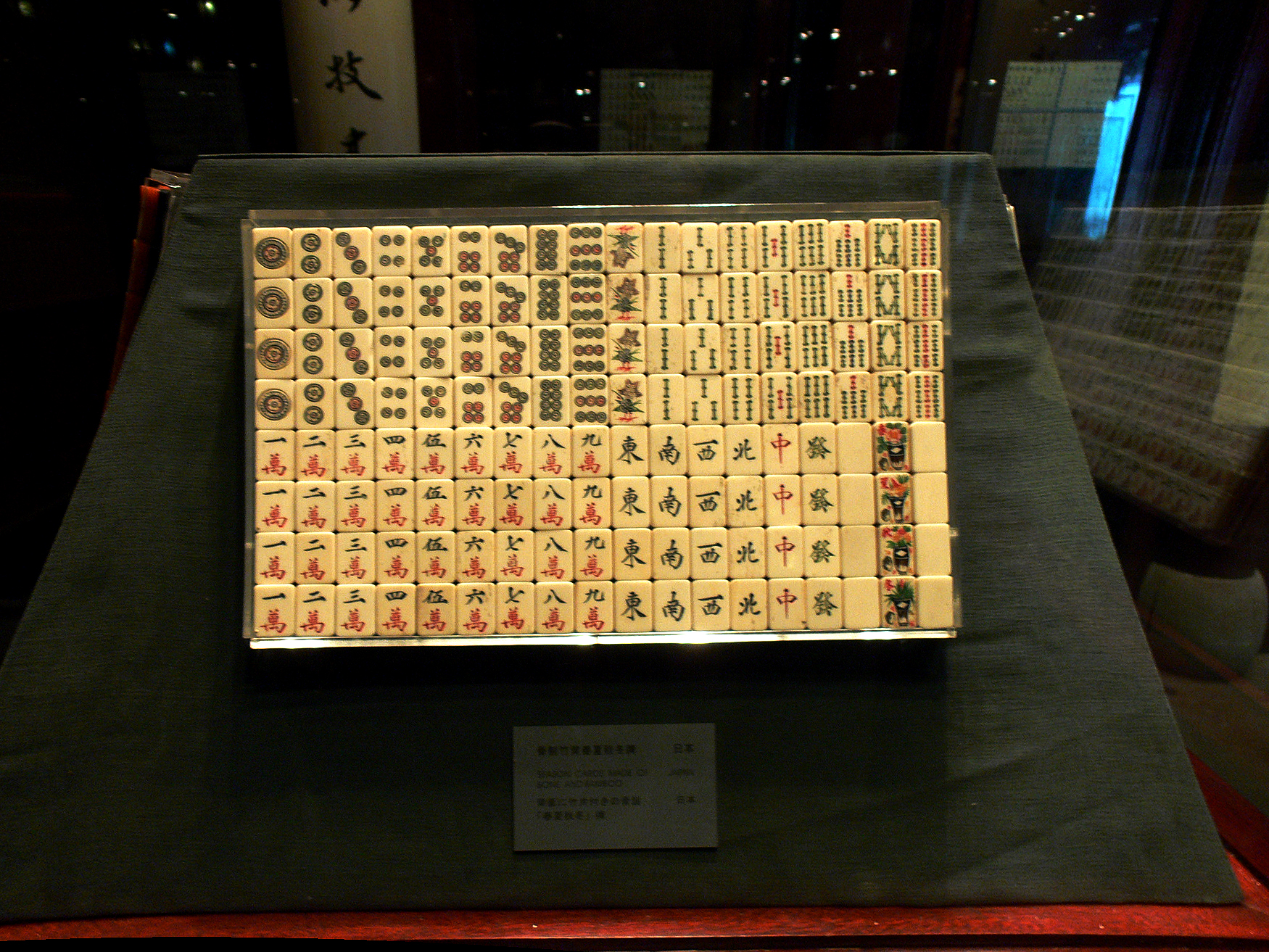
Majong Museum display

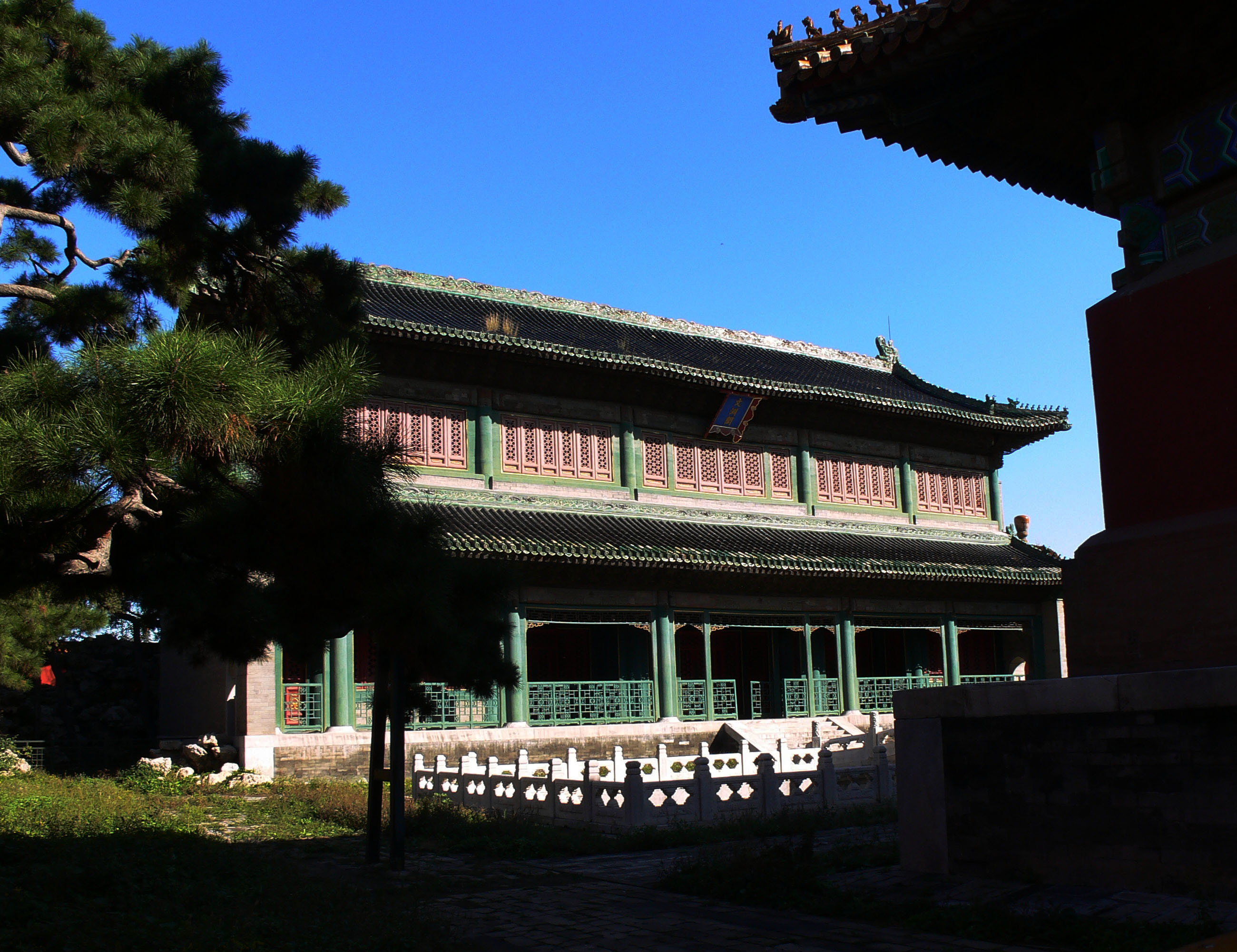
Wenyuan Chamber Imperial Library in the Forbidden City, modeled after the Tianyi Chamber

== See also ==
- Tianyi Ge Museum
- List of Chinese gardens
- List of libraries in China
