= Fan Qin =

Ming dynasty politician

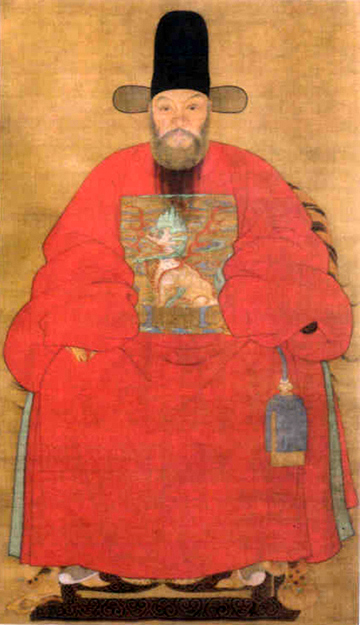
Portrait of Fan Qin

Fan Qin (simplified Chinese: 范钦; traditional Chinese: 范欽; pinyin: Fàn Qīn, 1506–1585, courtesy name: Yaoqing (堯卿), pseudonym: Dongming (東明)) was a politician and bibliophile of the Ming Dynasty.

Born in Ningbo in 1506, Fan Qin succeeded in the highest level of the Imperial examination in 1532 and obtained jinshi degree. In 1560, he was appointed right vice-minister of war (兵部右侍郎) under the Jiajing Emperor. Later, he resigned because of the dissatisfaction to Yan Song, the corrupt chancellor.

In 1561, Fan Qin founded Tianyi Chamber in Ningbo city, which is now the oldest existing library in China.
