= Ximenkou station (Ningbo Rail Transit) =

Metro station in Ningbo, China

Ximenkou 西门口
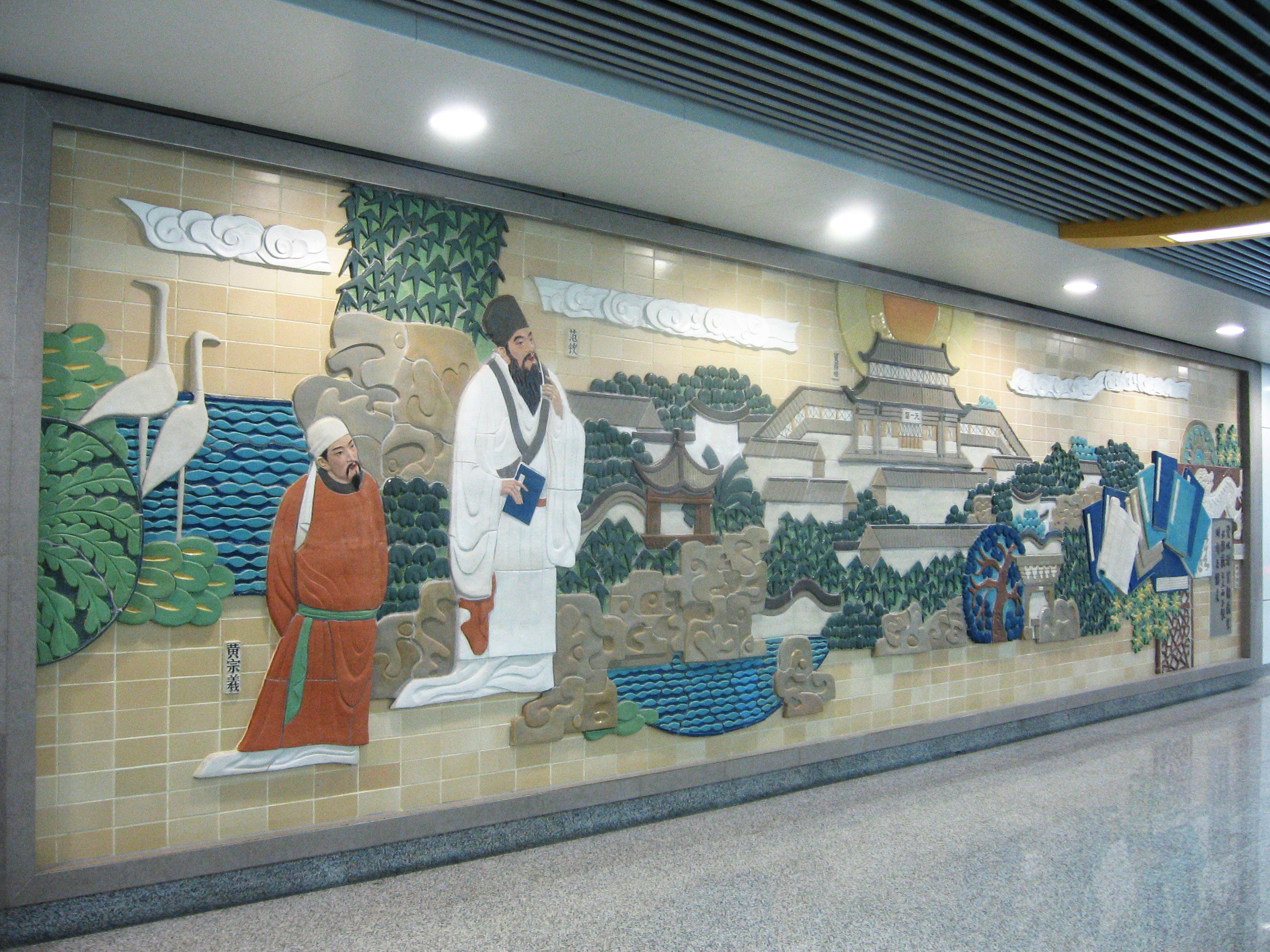
- Station cultural wall in the concourse

Chinese name
- Simplified Chinese: 西门口站
- Traditional Chinese: 西門口站
Transcriptions
Standard Mandarin
- Hanyu Pinyin: Xīménkǒu Zhàn

General information
- Other names: Tianyige Museum & Moon Lake Scenic Area (天一阁·月湖景区)
- Location: Zhongshan West Road (中山西路); Haishu District, Ningbo, Zhejiang; China
- Coordinates: 29°52′39″N 121°32′08″E
- System: Ningbo Rail Transit
- Operator: Ningbo Rail Transit Co. Ltd.
- Line: Line 1
- Platforms: 2 (1 island platform)
- Tracks: 2

Construction
- Structure type: Underground
- Accessible: Yes

History
- Opened: 30 May 2014

Services
Preceding station	Ningbo Rail Transit	Following station
Daqing Bridge towards Gaoqiao West	Line 1	Gulou towards Xiapu
Location

Ximenkou (Chinese: 西门口) is a subway station on Line 1 of the Ningbo Rail Transit that started operations on 30 May 2014. It is situated under Zhongshan Road (Chinese: 中山路) in Haishu District of Ningbo City, Zhejiang Province, eastern China.

== Exits ==
- B: Zhongshan West Road, Xiaoshi Alley (效实巷), Wangjing Road (望京路)
- D: Zhongshan West Road, Changchun Road (长春路), Lingchi Street (菱池街), Tianyi Ge Museum
