= Wenjin Ge =

Former imperial library in China

- 文津阁
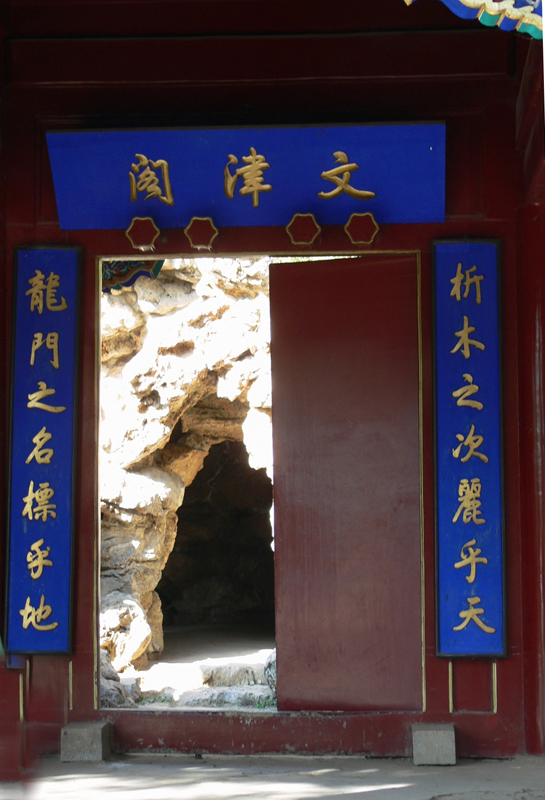
- Wenjin Chamber gate
- 40.994281838780104°N 117.94079379578768°E
- Location: Chengde, China
- Established: 1773

Wenjin Ge

Chinese name
- Simplified Chinese: 文津阁
- Traditional Chinese: 文津閣
Transcriptions
Standard Mandarin
- Hanyu Pinyin: Wénjīn Gé
- Wade–Giles: Wen-chin Ke

Manchu name
- Manchu script: ᡧᡠ ᡩᠣᡤᠣᠨ ᠠᠰᠠᡵᡳ
- Romanization: šu dogon asari

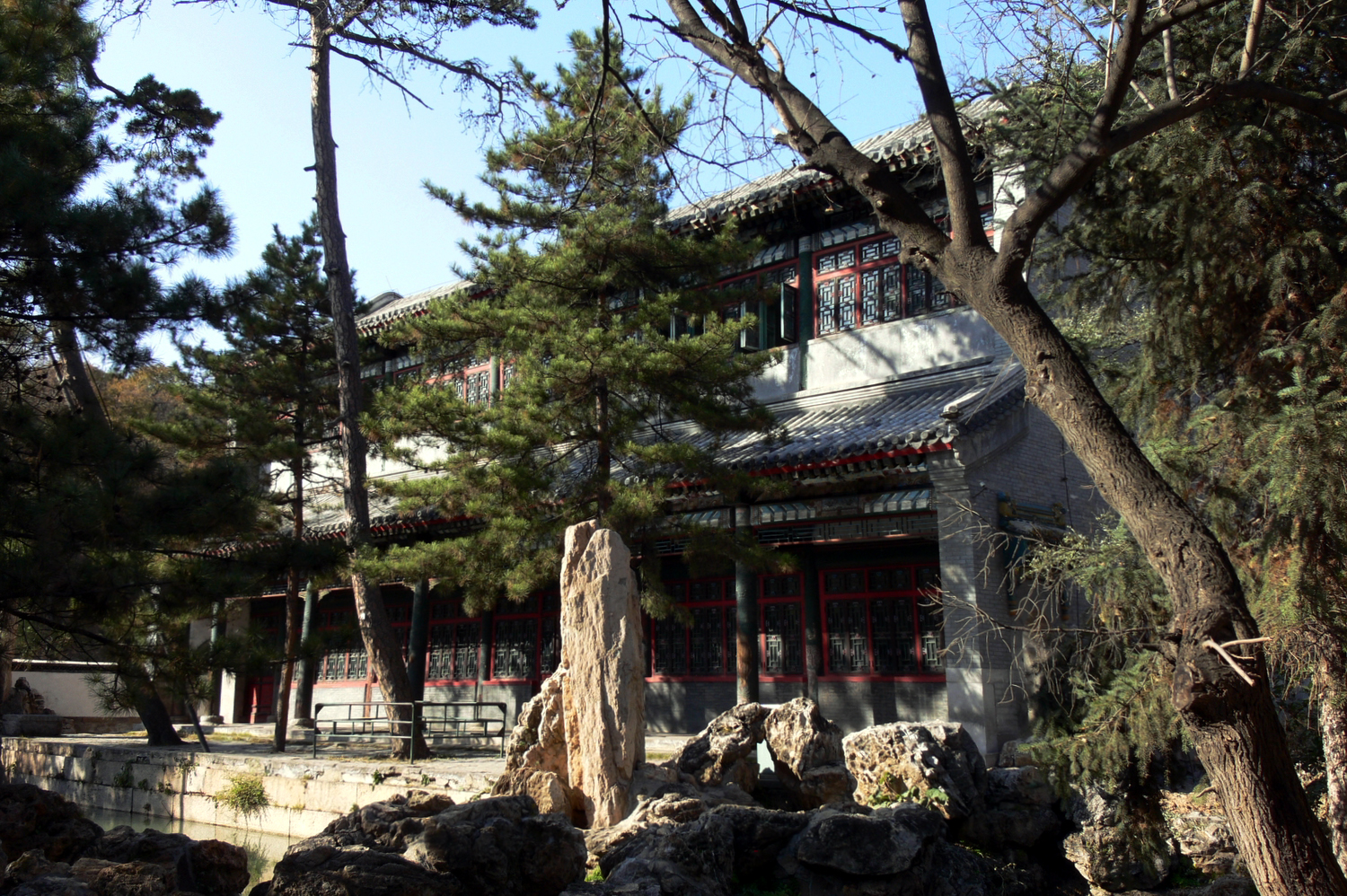
Wenjin Chamber Imperial Library

The Wenjin Ge (Chinese: 文津阁; pinyin: Wénjīn Gé; Manchu: ᡧᡠ
ᡩᠣᡤᠣᠨ
ᠠᠰᠠᡵᡳ šu dogon asari) is a former imperial library built in 1773 by the Qianlong Emperor of the Qing dynasty inside the Chengde Mountain Resort in Chengde, China. A copy of the Complete Library of the Four Treasuries was originally stored in this library.

The Wenjin Book Awards, awarded annually by the National Library of China are named after the Wenjin Ge library.

== See also ==
- Tianyi Ge
- Wenyuan Ge
- List of libraries in China
