= Belvedere of Literary Profundity =

Building in the Forbidden City

- 文渊阁
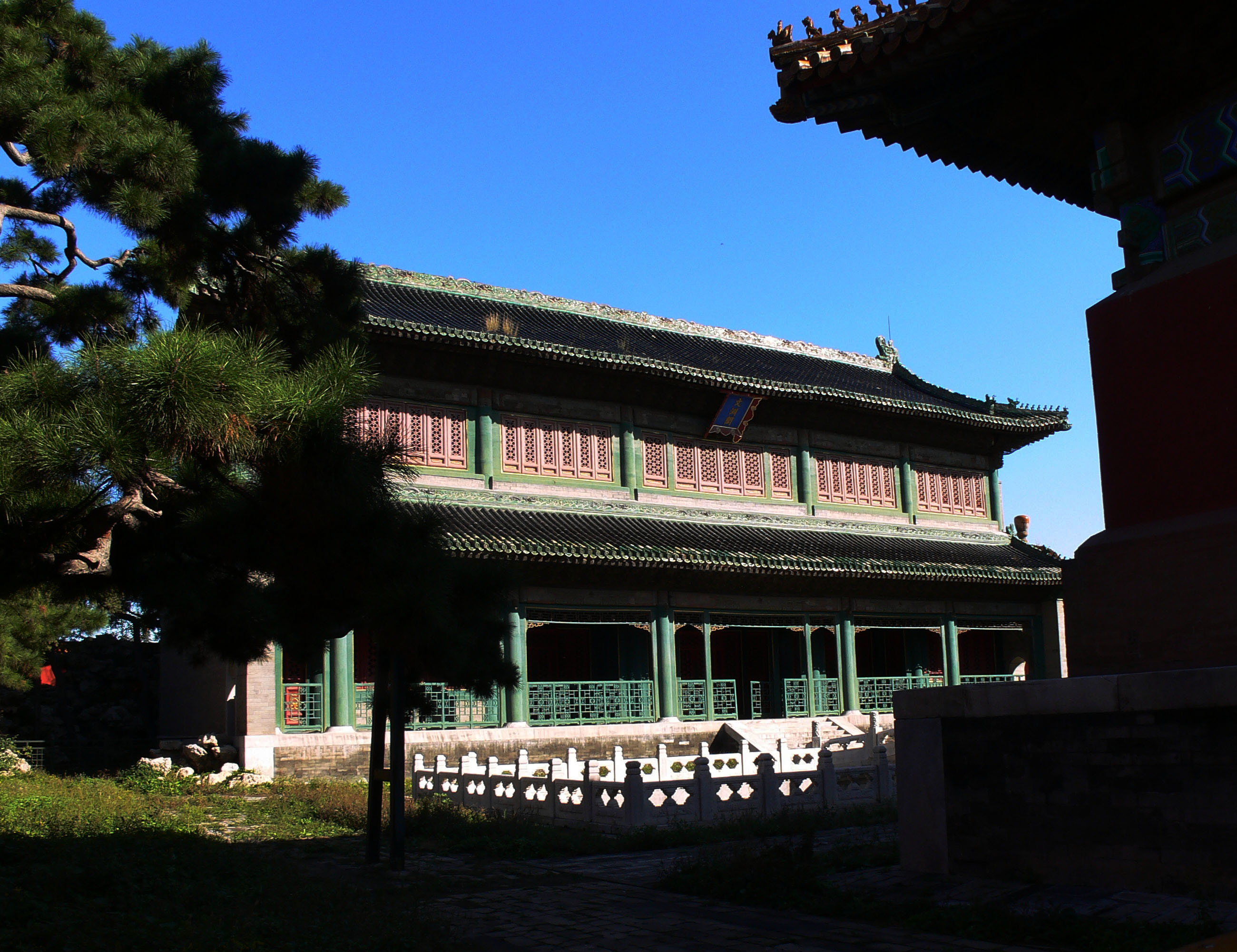
- Wenyuan Ge
- Interactive map of the Belvedere of Literary Profundity area

General information
- Type: Palace building
- Location: Beijing, China
- Coordinates: 39.91629512740444°N 116.39952820366824°E
- Completed: 1776

Website
- www.dpm.org.cn/explore/building/236513.html

The Belvedere of Literary Profundity (simplified Chinese: 文渊阁; traditional Chinese: 文淵閣; pinyin: Wényuān Gé; Wade–Giles: Wen-yuan Ko; Manchu: ᡧᡠ
ᡨᡠᠩᡤᡠ
ᠠᠰᠠᡵᡳ šu tunggu asari), Wenyuan Ge or Wenyuan Library is a palace building in the Forbidden City in Beijing.

The hall was an imperial library, and a place for learned discussion so several Grand Secretaries were assigned here. It was sited to the east of the Fengtian Gate in Nanjing, during the Hongwu era. After the Yongle Emperor made Beijing China's capital, its name continued to be used for the lobby in the east of the Cabinet Hall of the Forbidden City, which was burnt down in the late Ming period.

The existing hall which is patterned on the Tianyi Ge in Ningbo was rebuilt behind the Wenhua Palace, in the reign of the Qianlong Emperor. Completed in 1776, it was a kind of library and stored numerous works, including a copy of the Complete Library of the Four Treasuries. The Wenjin Ge in the Chengde Mountain Resort is its counterpart.
