= Tianyi Ge Museum =

Tianyi Ge museums
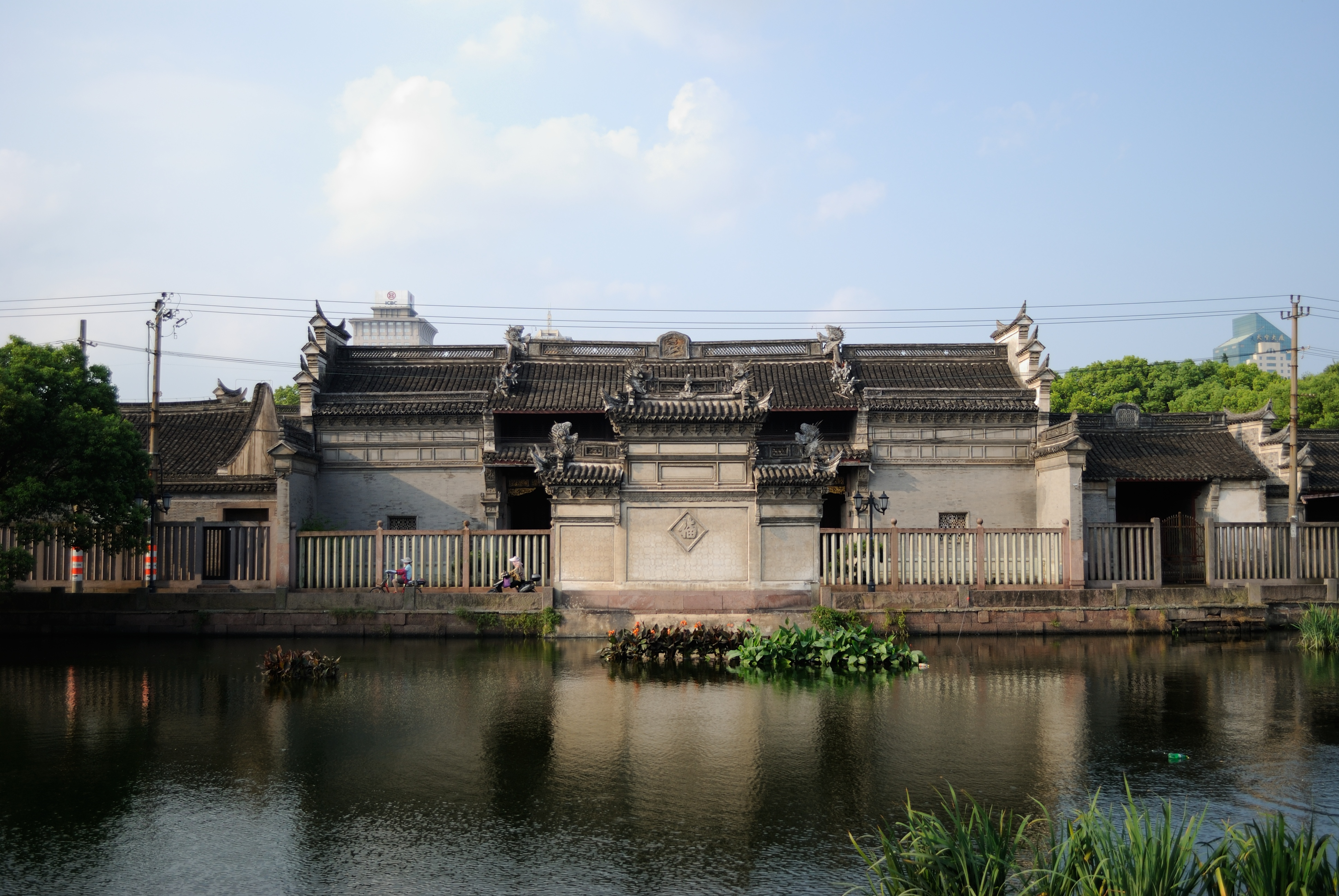
- The south gate of the Qin branch ancestral hall is now the exit of the museum
- Established: November 1994
- Location: Zhejiang Ningbo Haishu District
- Coordinates: 29.8735°N 121.5358°E
- Type: Thematic museums
- Website: http://www.tianyige.com.cn/

Tianyi Ge Museum is a National first-grade museums of China in Ningbo City, Zhejiang Province, with Tianyi Ge as the core of the Ming Dynasty Library Building, located at No. 10, Tianyi Street, Haishu District, Ningbo City, Zhejiang Province. It is a thematic museum with book collection culture as the core, integrating research, protection, management, display, social education, and tourism of book collections. It covers an area of about 34,000 square meters, which is divided into a book collection cultural area, a garden leisure area, and an exhibition area. The collection of Ningbo Tianyi Ge Museum includes ancient books, calligraphy and paintings, inscriptions, various unearthed and handed down ceramics, bronzes, jades, etc., and local crafts. As of 2019, Ningbo Tianyi Ge Museum has a collection of nearly 300,000 volumes of ancient books, most of which are historical books such as local chronicles and Dengkelu, including more than 80,000 rare books. Founded in November 1994. The museum has jurisdiction over Tianyi Ge and its nearby Qin branch ancestral hall, Chen clan ancestral hall, as well as Haishu District's Fu Tarsus Room, Tianfeng Tower, Baiyunzhuang, Ningbo Drum Tower and other cultural relics protection units. Among them, Tianyi Ge, Qin's Branch Ancestral Hall, and Baiyunzhuang are National priority protected site. The museum is also a national key protection unit for ancient books and a national ancient book restoration center.

== History ==
The history of the Tianyi Ge Museum can be traced back to 1933. That year, the eastern wall of the Tianyi Ge was blown down by a typhoon, and the descendants of the Fan family could not afford to repair it. Consequently, local figures formed the Tianyi Ge Restoration Committee to raise funds for its restoration. At the same time, the Zunjing Ge, originally located in the Confucian Temple of Ningbo, along with a collection of steles dating from the Song to Qing dynasties, was relocated to the rear courtyard of the Tianyi Ge, forming what was named the "Mingzhou Stele Forest."After the People's Liberation Army took over Ningbo in 1949, the Cultural and Educational Department of the Ningbo Military Control Commission assumed control of the Tianyi Ge. It established an antiquities exhibition hall within the Zunjing Ge and appointed Fan Luqi, a descendant of the Fan family, as its director.In 1960, the antiquities exhibition hall was transformed into the Ningbo Cultural Relics Management Committee. In 1994, the Ningbo Museum was merged into the Tianyi Ge, leading to the establishment of the Ningbo Tianyi Ge Museum.On April 30, 2020, the Ningbo Tianyi Ge Museum and the Ningbo Baoguo Temple Ancient Architecture Museum were integrated to form the Ningbo Tianyi Ge Museum Complex.

== Architectural and landscape design ==
The main area managed by Tianyi Ge Museum is the temple of Qin Family, the temple of Chen Family and the ancestral hall of Wen Family. After renovation and development, it is currently composed of three parts: the library culture area, the exhibition area and the garden leisure area. Among them, the collection culture area is composed of Baoshu building (namely Tianyi Library), Fan's residential area, Zunjing Ge and Mingzhou Tablet Forest, which were relocated in the Republic of China. The exhibition area is composed of Qin Clan Ancestral Hall, Furong Island and calligraphy and painting hall. The garden leisure area consists of various garden attractions . In addition, the museum also manages cultural relics protection units outside the museum, such as the Fu Tarsi Room, Tianfeng Tower, Baiyun Zhuang and Ningbo Drum Tower.

Plan of Tianyi Ge Museum

=== Tianyi Ge ===
Tianyi Ge is the core of Tianyi Ge Museum, including Baoshu Building, Dongming Straw Hall, Simadi and affiliated gardens, which mainly displays the culture of collecting books . In 1982, it became the second batch of national key cultural relics protection units.

=== Qin branch ancestral hall ===
The Qin branch ancestral hall is located southwest of the Tianyi Pavilion Museum. It was originally built in 1925 by Qin Jihan, a banker from Ningbo. The architecture incorporates various traditional folk arts, including wood carving, brick carving, stone carving, gilding, and "kaozuo" craftsmanship, making it a masterpiece of traditional Ningbo architecture. In 2001, it was incorporated into the Tianyi Pavilion National Key Cultural Relics Protection Unit.

=== Zunjing Pavilion ===
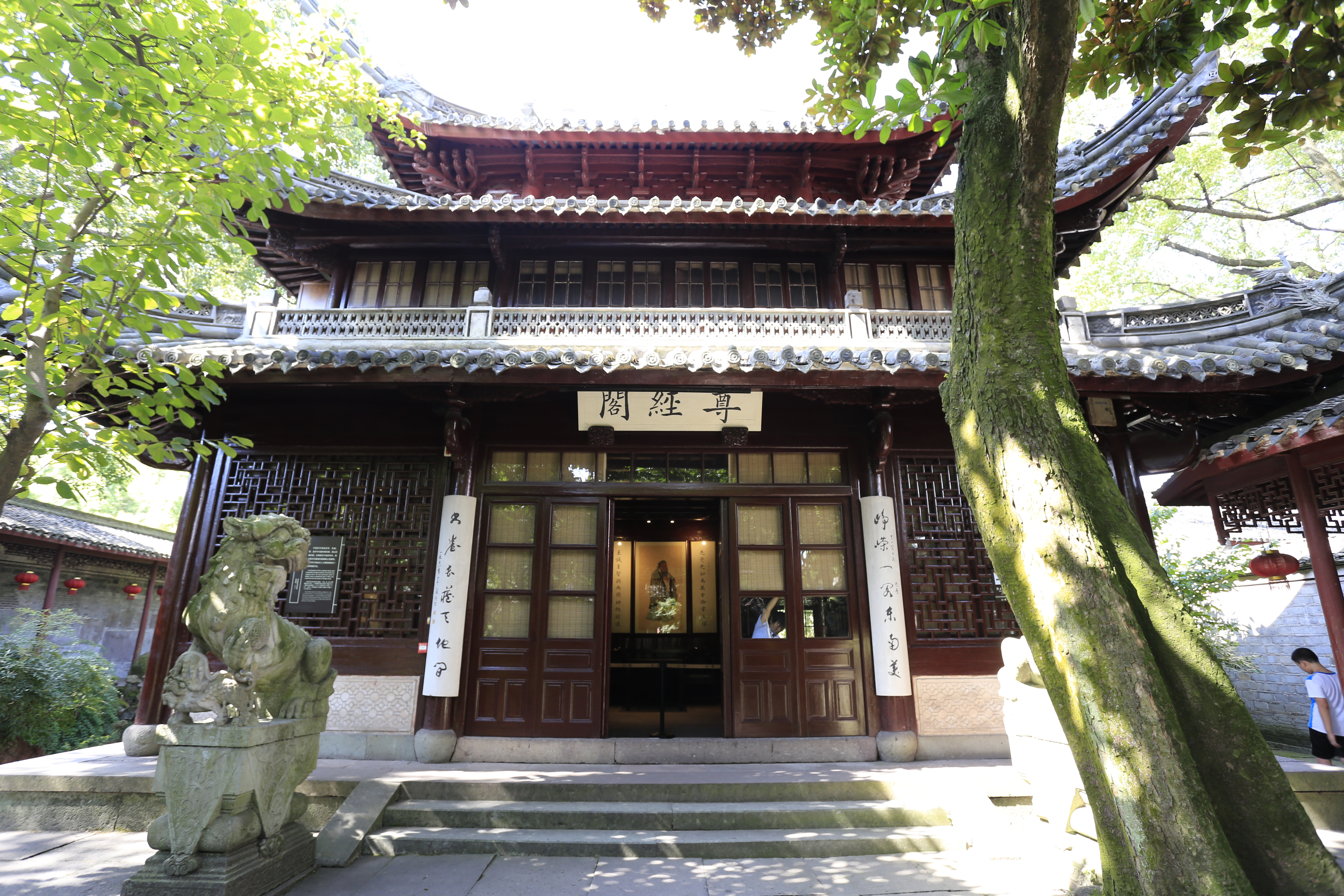
Zunjing Pavilion

The Zunjing Pavilion was originally located within the Ningbo Prefectural School and was built during the Guangxu era of the Qing Dynasty. In 1935, it was relocated to the Tianyi Pavilion during its reconstruction. The pavilion features an East Asian hip-and-gable roof and houses imperial books and Confucian classics.

=== Mingzhou Stele Forest ===
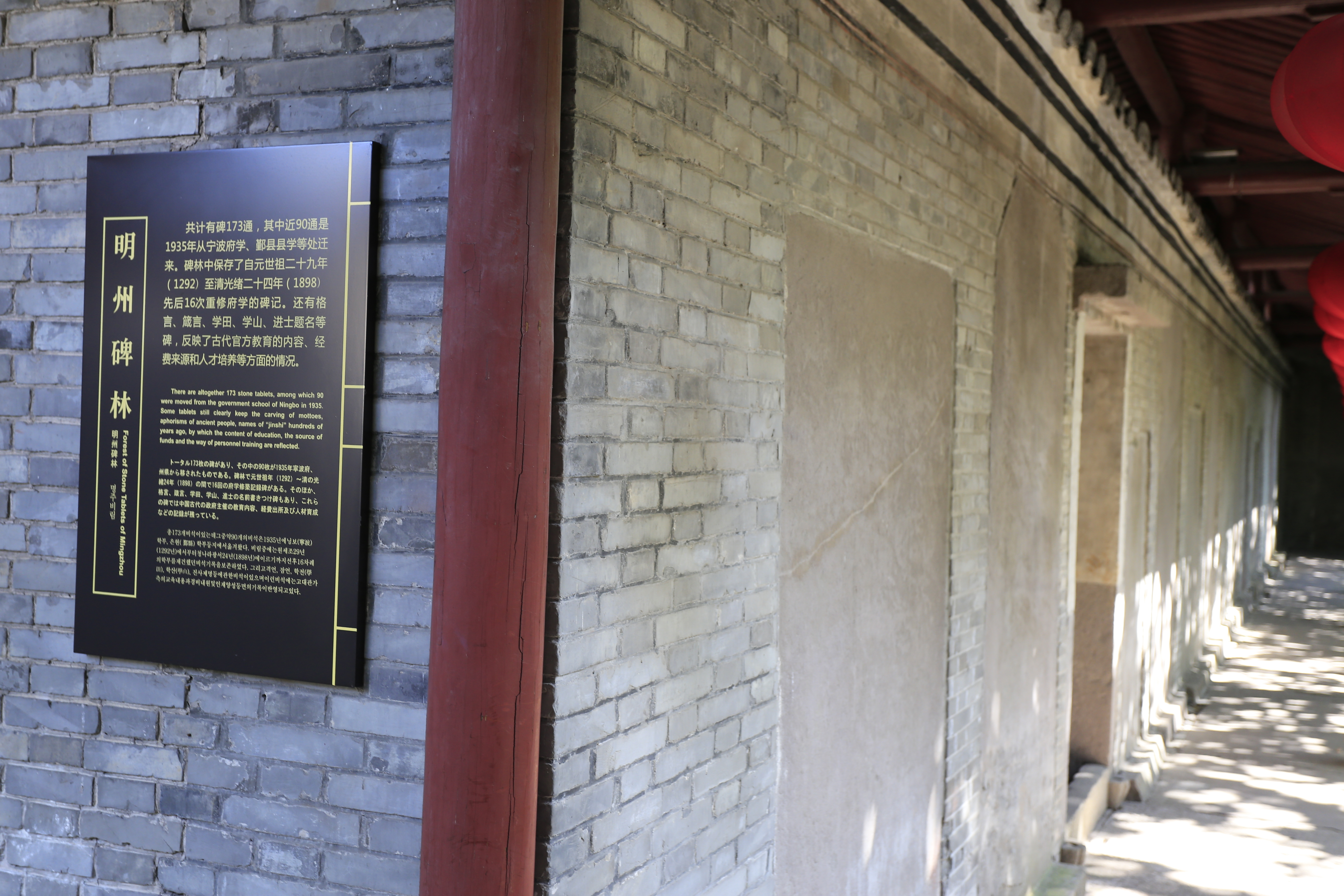
Mingzhou Stele Forest

Located on the east side of the Tianyi Pavilion Museum, the Mingzhou Stele Forest was established during the reconstruction of the Tianyi Pavilion from 1933 to 1935. Along with the relocation of the Zunjing Pavilion from the Ningbo Confucian Temple, a collection of steles from the Song to Qing dynasties was also moved to the rear courtyard of the Tianyi Pavilion and collectively named the "Mingzhou Stele Forest." Later, additional ancient steles were gradually relocated to the site.

=== Qianjin Studio ===
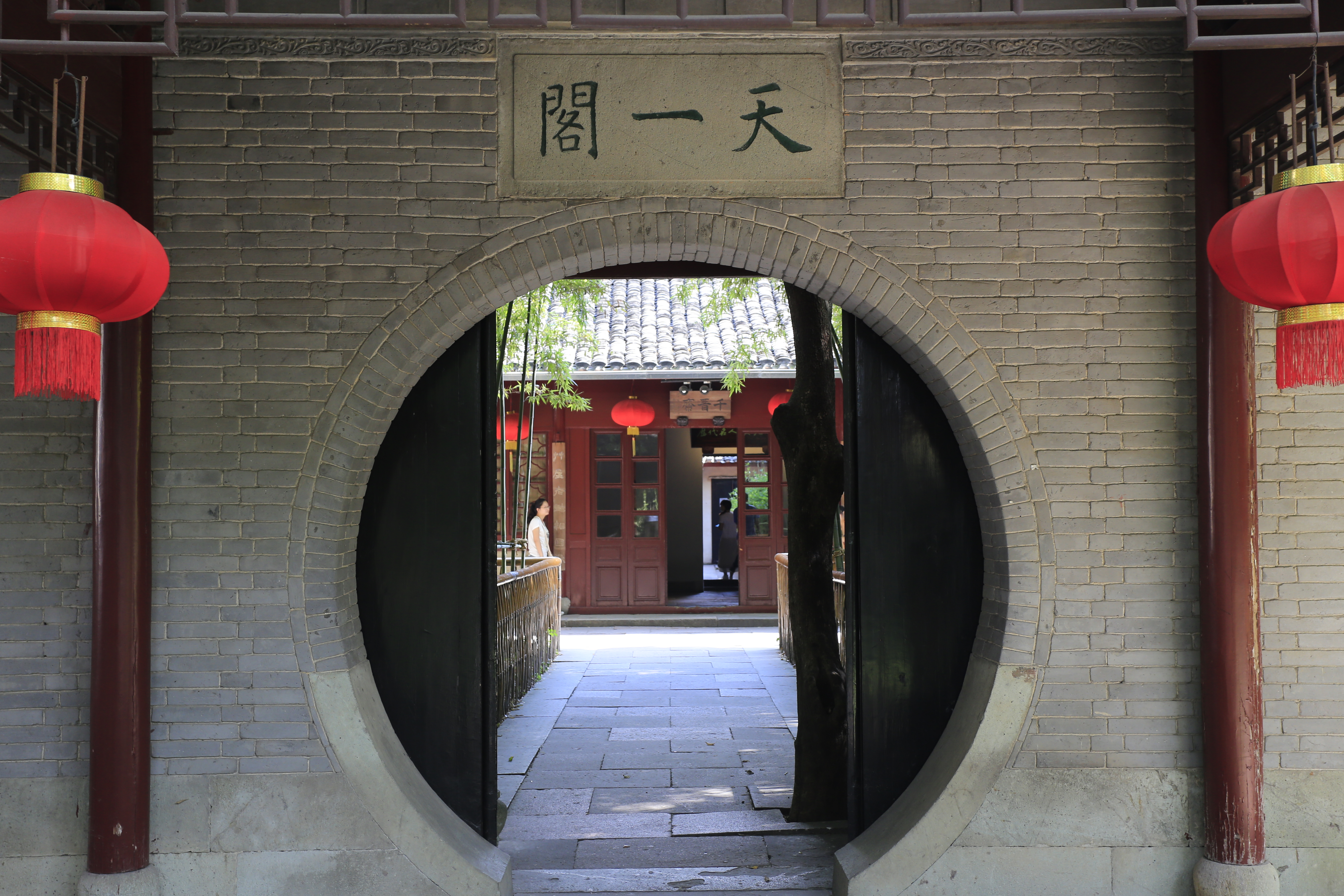
Qianjin Studio

Located within the Tianyi Pavilion Museum, adjacent to the Baoshu Tower and the Zunjing Pavilion, the Qianjin Studio is a row of bungalows built in the 1930s. During the reconstruction of the Tianyi Pavilion from 1933 to 1935, Ma Lian donated his collection of over a thousand ancient bricks from the Han and Jin dynasties to the pavilion. When the Tianyi Pavilion designated a space to display this collection, it retained the original name of Ma Lian's private collection.

=== Bai’e Pavilion ===
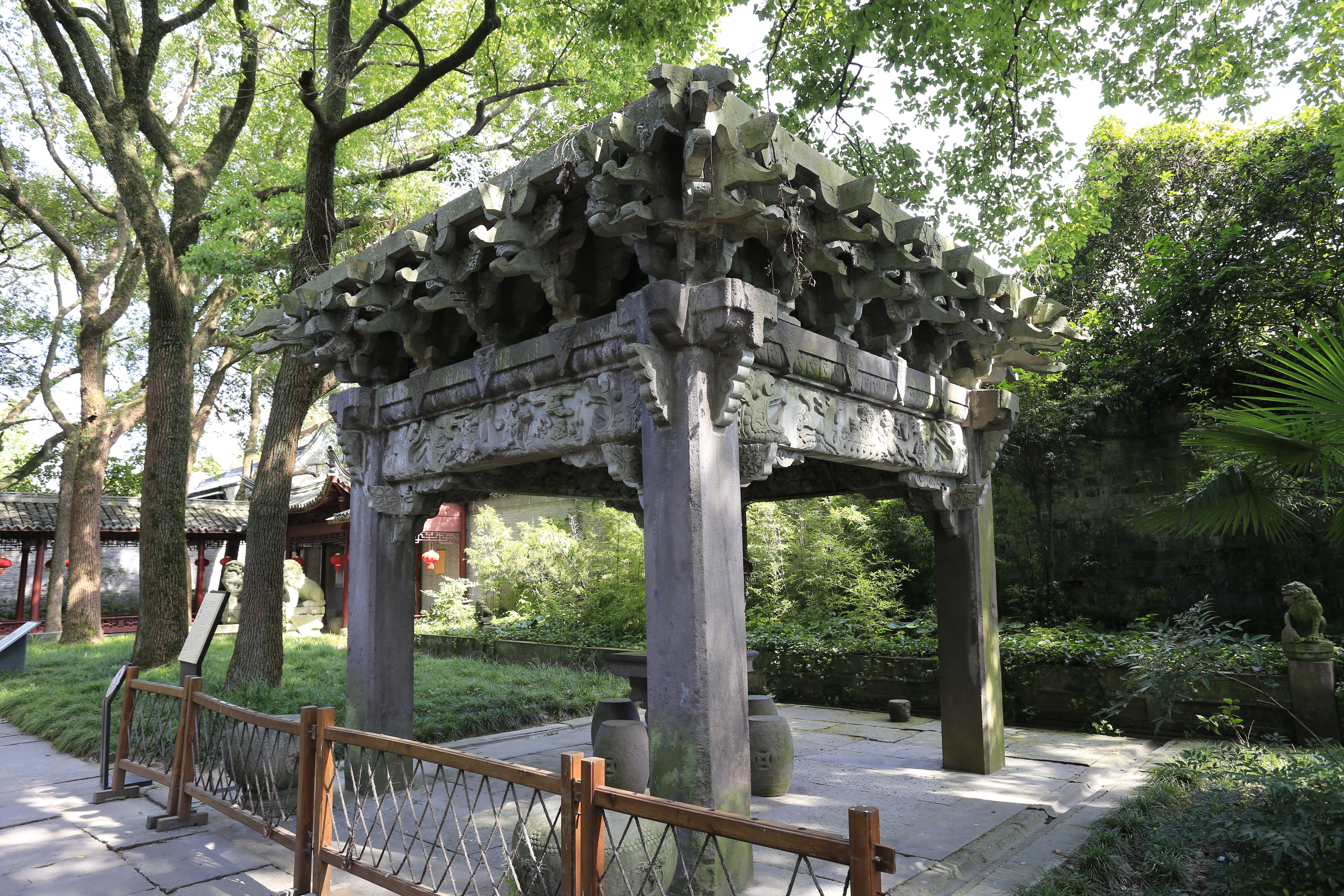
Bai’e Pavilion

The Bai’e Pavilion, built during the Wanli period of the Ming Dynasty, was originally located at Zuguan Mountain in Ningbo as a memorial pavilion in front of a tomb. In 1959, it was relocated to the Tianyi Pavilion. Its beams and plaques are adorned with carvings of patterns such as "Fish Leaping Over the Dragon Gate," "Two Lions Playing with a Ball," "Sea Horse Riding the Waves," and "Qilin Presenting Treasures."

=== Shuibei Pavilion ===
The Shuibei Pavilion was originally built in June of the third year of the Tongzhi reign (1864) and was located at No. 18 Huachi Lane outside the West Gate of Ningbo. It served as a private library for Xu Shidong. In 1984, it was designated as a cultural relic protection unit in Haishu District. In 1996, it was relocated to the southern garden of the Tianyi Pavilion Museum and, in 1999, repurposed as the Chinese Local Gazetteer Archives.

=== Chen Clan Ancestral Hall ===
The Chen Clan Ancestral Hall is the family shrine of Chen Yumen, the inventor of modern Mahjong. It is currently established as the Mahjong Origins Exhibition Hall.

== Exhibition ==
During its merger with the Ningbo Museum, the Tianyi Pavilion Museum once hosted permanent exhibitions on Ningbo history and craftsmanship. However, these exhibitions have since been relocated to the Ningbo Museum, which was built in 2008. Currently, the museum features seven permanent exhibition halls, including the Private Library Exhibition, Tianyi Pavilion Historical Exhibition, Tianyi Pavilion Calligraphy Stone Exhibition, Qianjin Studio Brick Collection Exhibition, Qin Clan Ancestral Hall Cultural Exhibition, Mahjong Origins Exhibition, and the Chinese Local Gazetteer Archives.

== Image ==
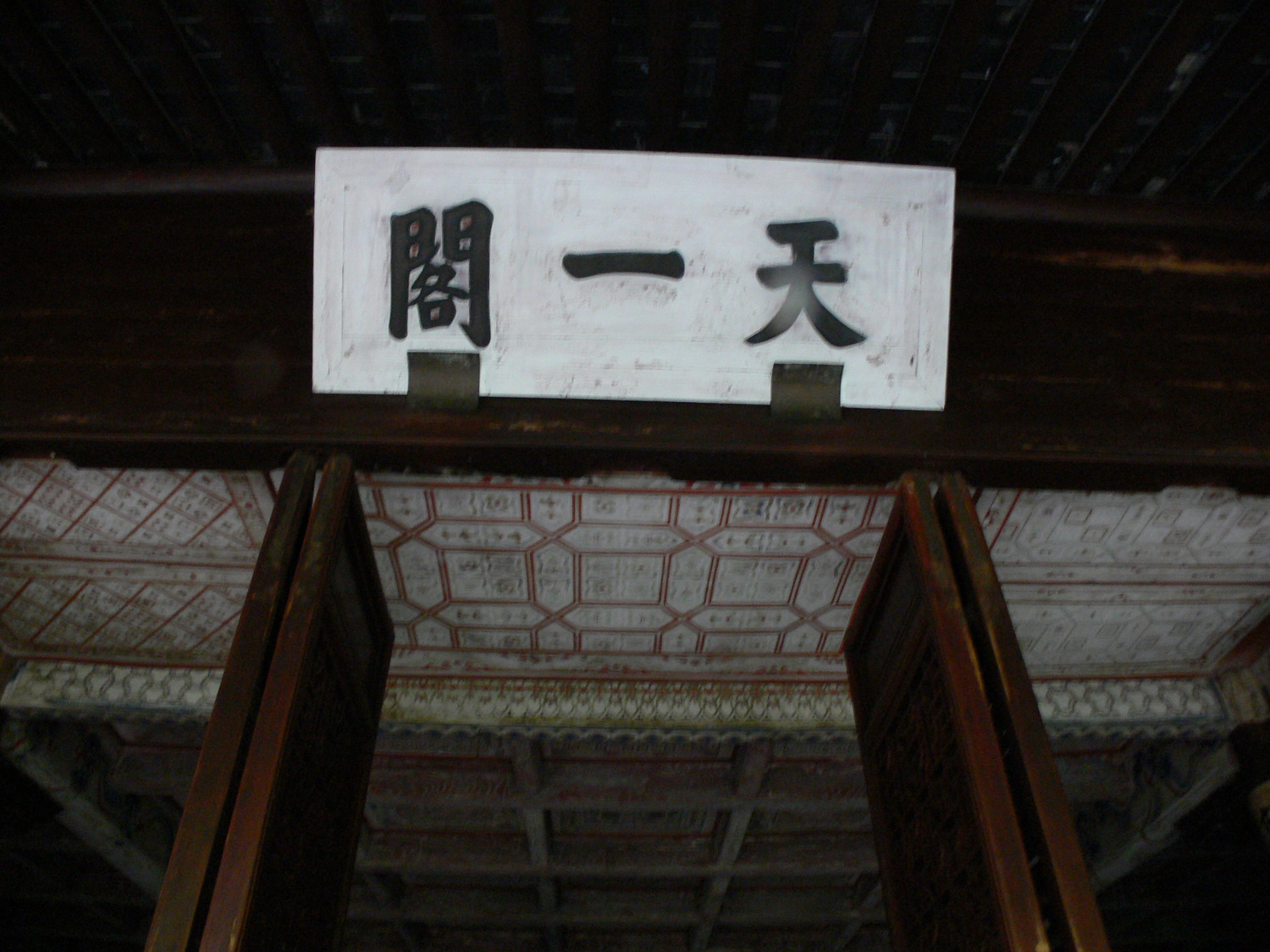
Tianyi Ge Inscription

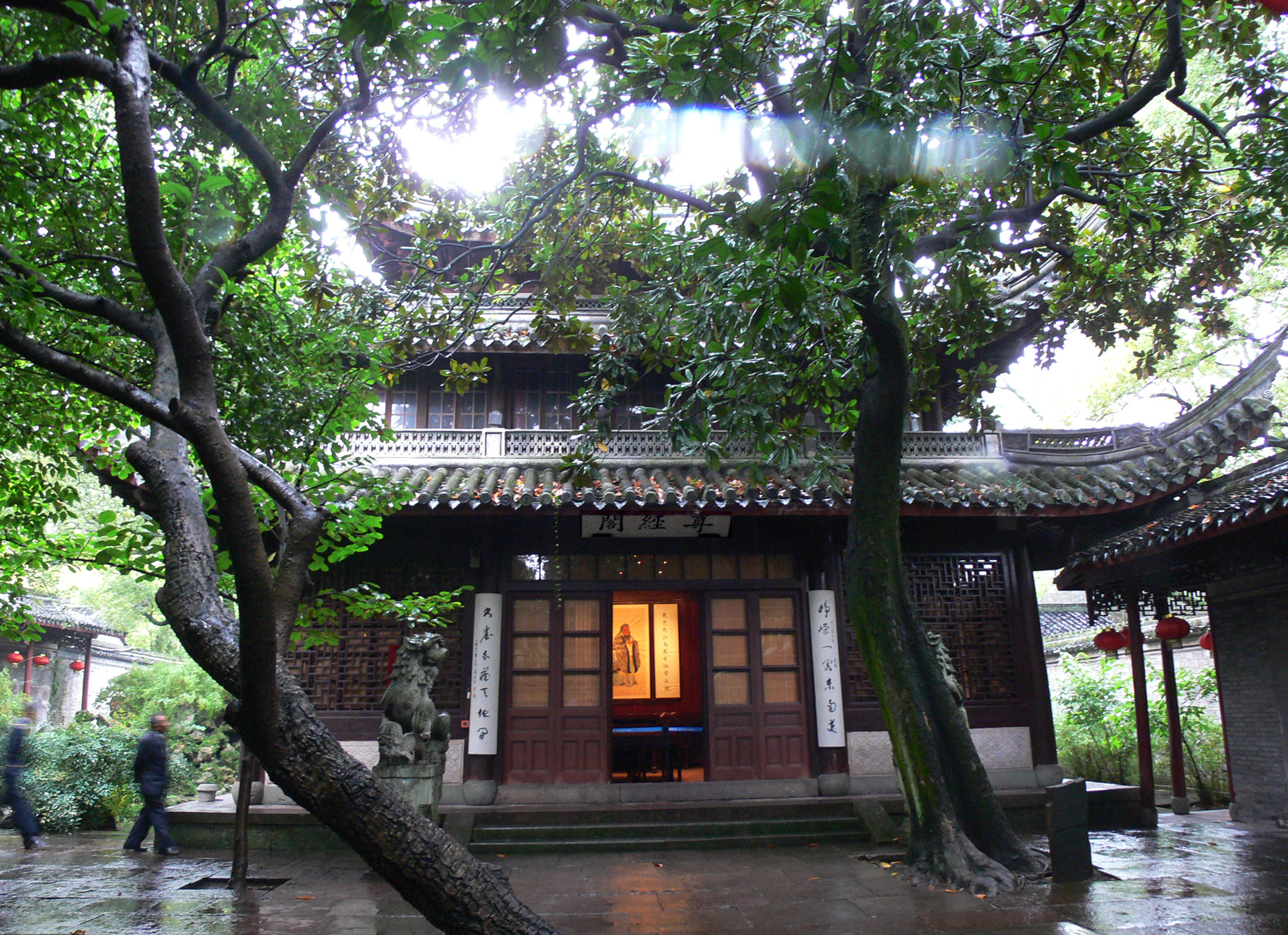
Zunjing Pavilion

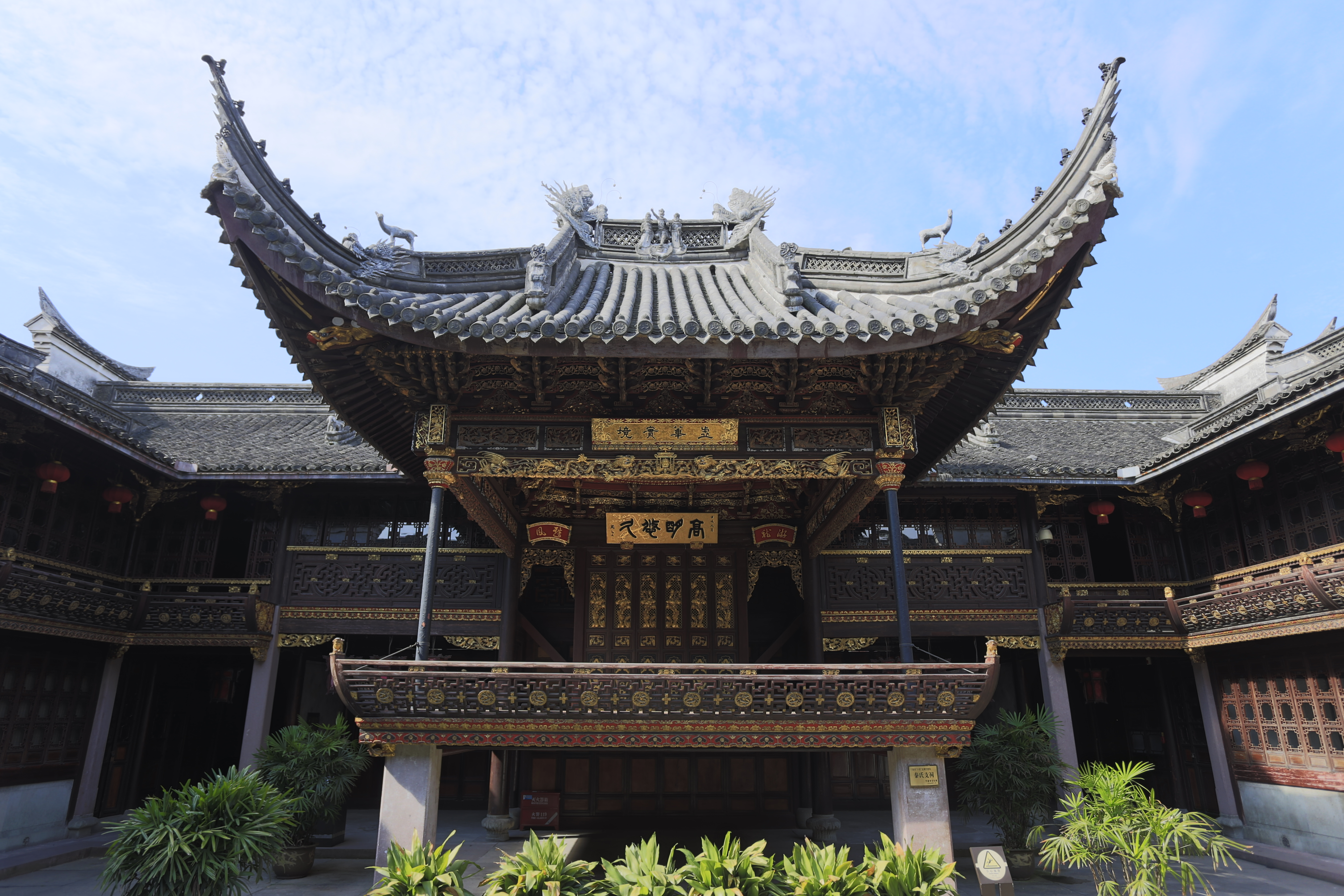
Qin Clan Ancestral Hall Opera Stage

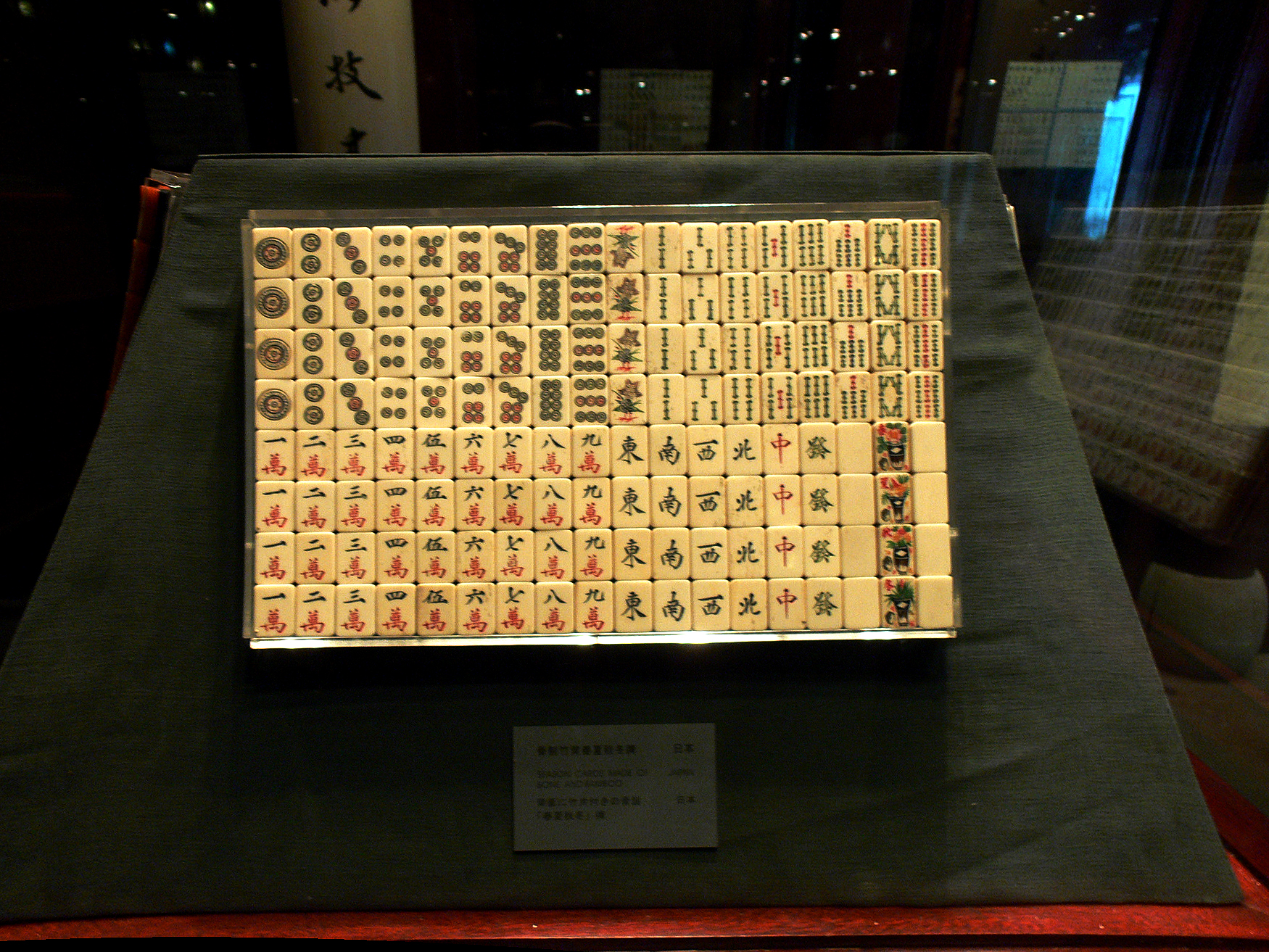
Mahjong Exhibition Hall Mahjong Display
