= Sakura Park station =

Ningbo Metro station

Coordinates: 29.8667°N 121.5776°E

Sakura Park 樱花公园
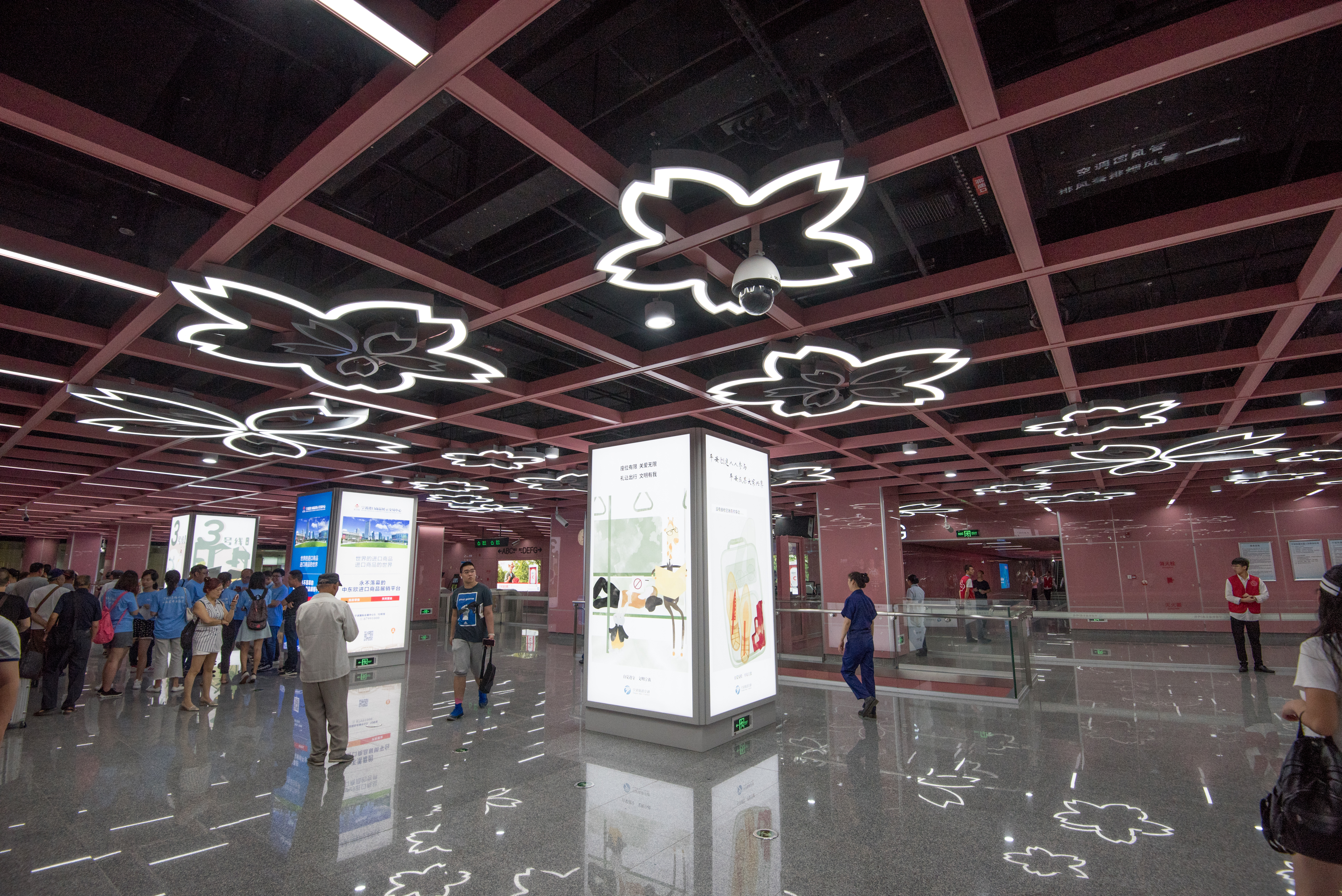

General information
- Location: Yinzhou District, Ningbo, Zhejiang; China
- Operated by: Ningbo Rail Transit Co. Ltd.
- Line(s): Line 1; Line 3
- Platforms: 4 (2 island platform)

Construction
- Structure type: Underground

History
- Opened: 30 May 2014

Services
Preceding station	Ningbo Rail Transit	Following station
Zhoumeng North Road towards Gaoqiao West	Line 1	Fuming Road towards Xiapu
Sports Center towards Datong Bridge	Line 3	Children's Park towards Jinhai Road

Sakura Park Station (simplified Chinese: 樱花公园站; traditional Chinese: 櫻花公園站; pinyin: Yīnghuā Gōngyuán Zhàn) is a station on Line 1 and Line 3 of the Ningbo Rail Transit that started operations on 30 May 2014. It is located under Zhongshan Road (Chinese: 中山路) in Yinzhou District of Ningbo City, Zhejiang Province, eastern China. In 2019, it became an interchange station between Line 1 and Line 3.

== Exits ==
Exit number	Exit location
Exit A	Zhongshan East Road, Zhongxing Road, Fengdan Apartment
Exit B	Zhongxing Road
Exit C	Zhongshan East Road, Sakura Park
Exit D	Zhongshan East Road, Zhongxing Road, Building of China Eastern Airlines

== Gallery ==
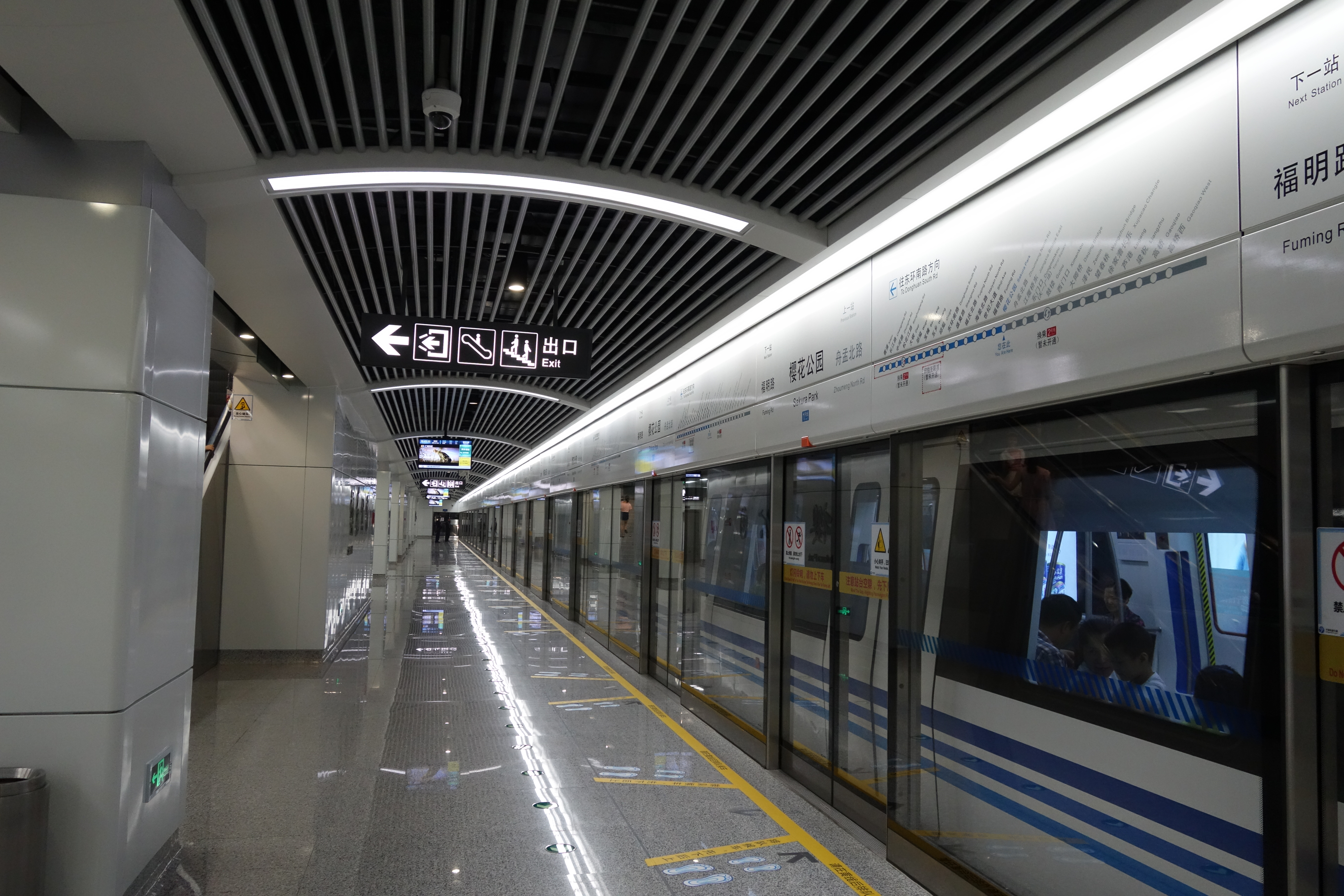
Line 1 platform

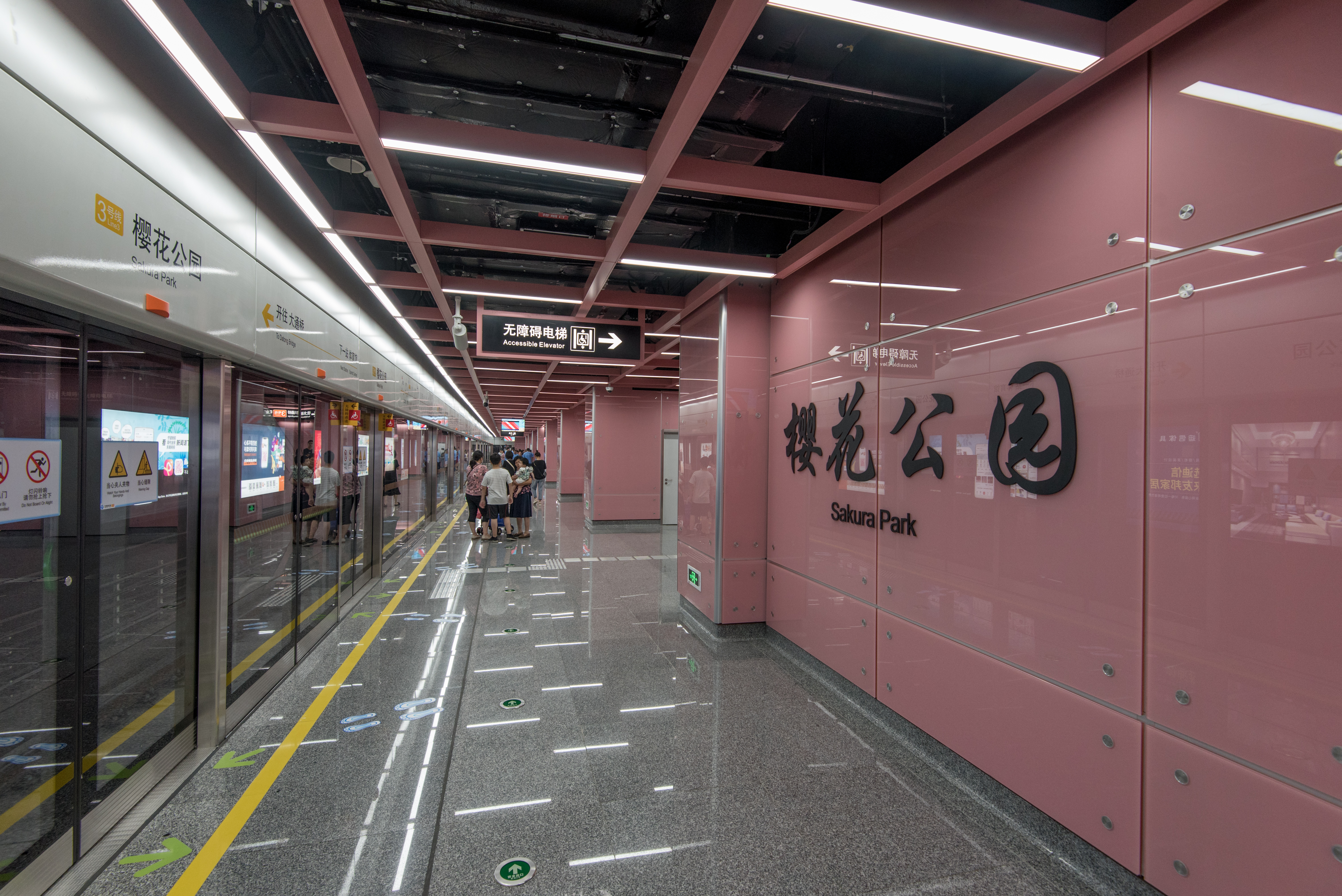
Line 3 platform
