= Minglou station =

Rapid transit station in Zhejiang, China

Minglou 明楼站
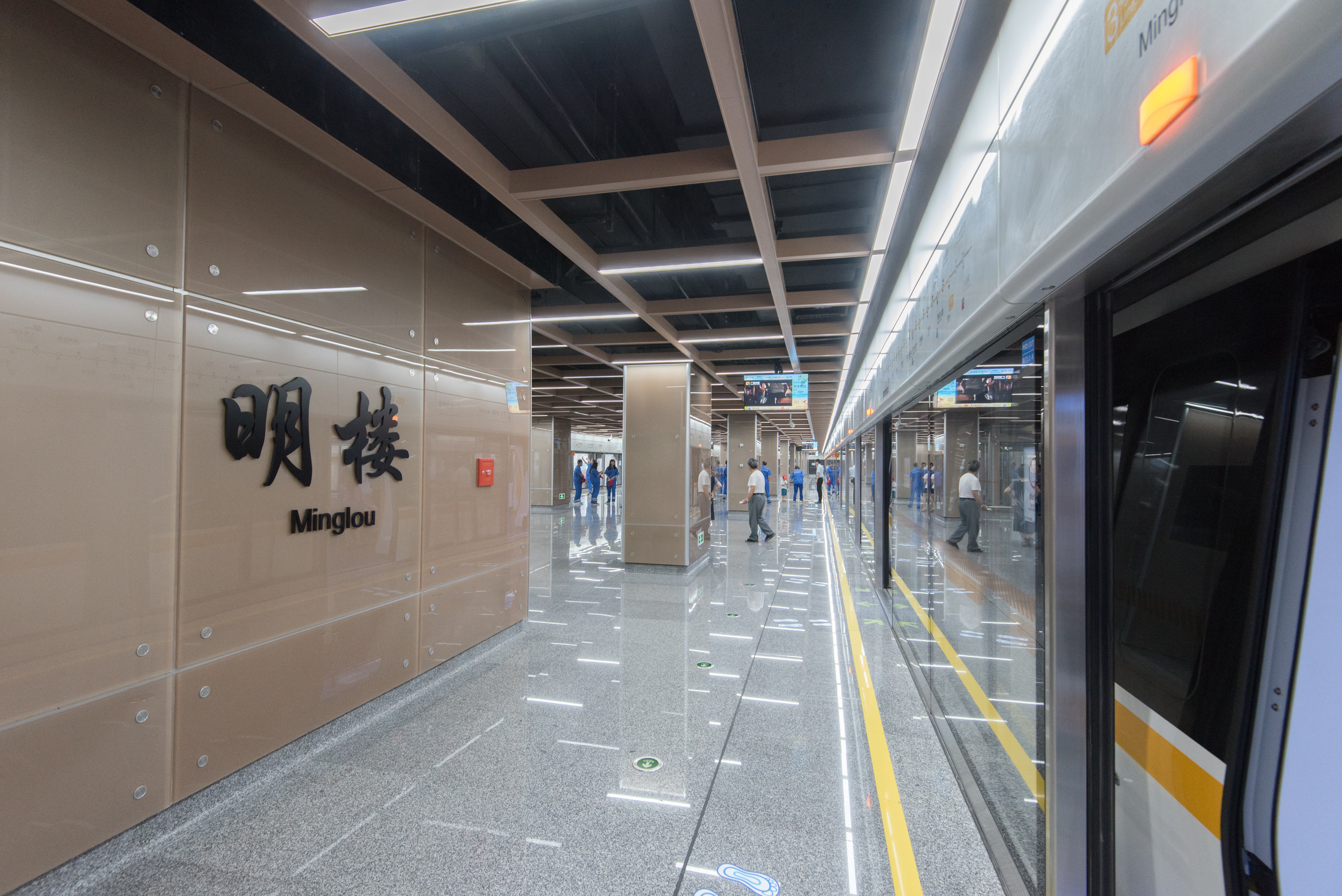
- Minglou Station, 30 June 2019

General information
- Location: Zhongxing Road × Tongtu Road; Yinzhou District, Ningbo, Zhejiang; China
- Coordinates: 29°52′56″N 121°35′06″E
- Operated by: Ningbo Rail Transit Co. Ltd.
- Lines: Line 3 Line 6
- Platforms: 2 (1 island platform)

Construction
- Structure type: Underground

History
- Opened: 30 June 2019 (Line 3); 16 January 2026 (Line 6)

Services
Preceding station	Ningbo Rail Transit	Following station
Zhongxing Bridge South towards Datong Bridge	Line 3	Sports Center towards Jinhai Road
Qingfeng Bridge East towards Gulin	Line 6	Mingzhu Road towards Honglian
Location

Minglou Station is an underground metro station of Line 3 and Line 6 in Ningbo, Zhejiang, China. It is situated at the crossing of Zhongxing Road and Tongtu Road north. Line 3 opened on 30 June 2019 and Line 6 opened on 16 January 2026.

== Exits ==
Minglou station has six exits.

No	Suggested destinations
A	Zhongxing Road
B	Zhongxing Road, Dasheng Road
C	Zhongxin Road, Tongtu Road
D	Zhongxing Road, Tongtu Road
E	Tongtu Road
F	Tongtu Road
