= Chaoyang station (Ningbo Rail Transit) =

Metro station in Ningbo, China

Chaoyang 朝阳
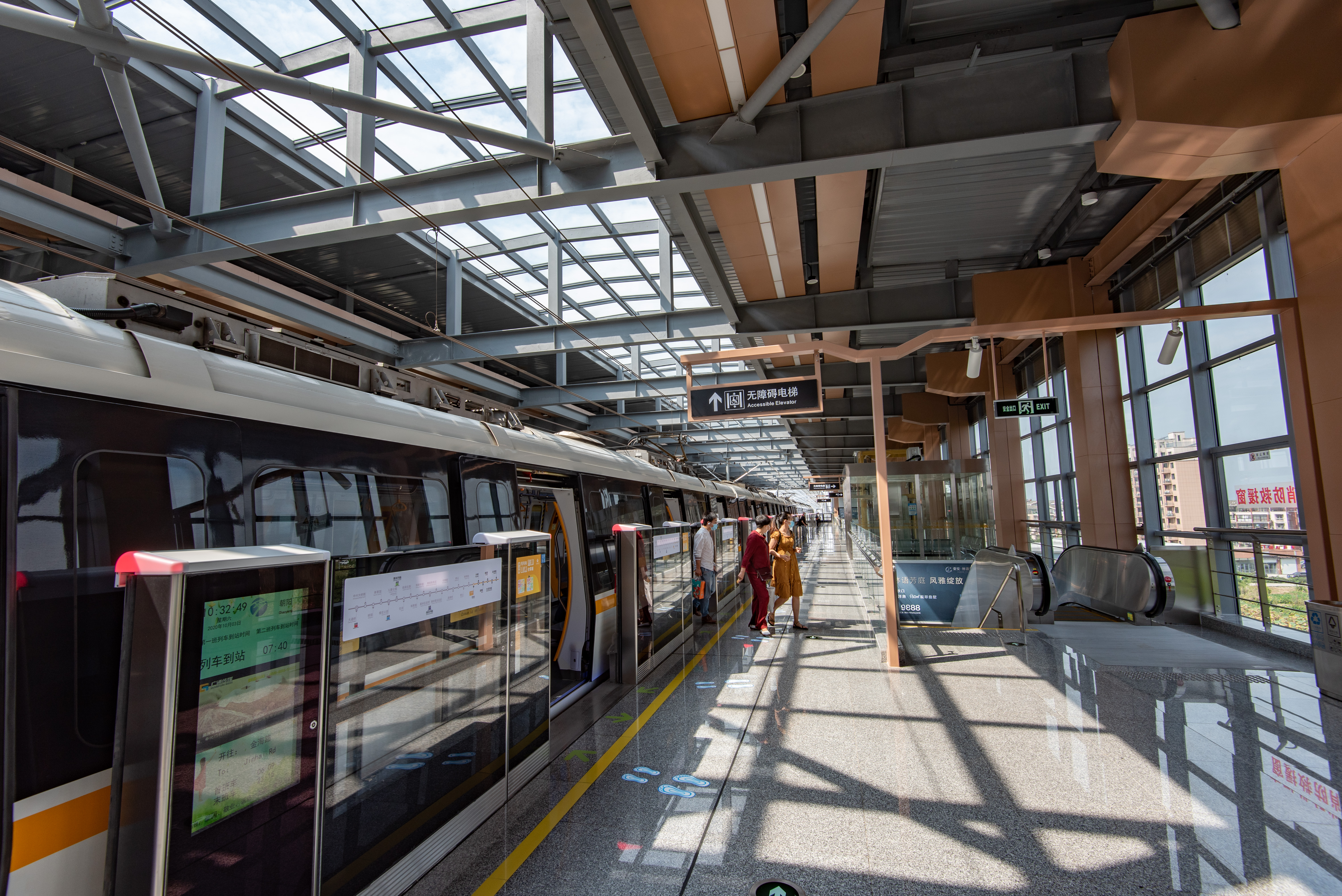
- Platform towards Jinhai Road

General information
- Location: Yanhu Road; Yinzhou District, Ningbo, Zhejiang; China
- Coordinates: 29°46′03″N 121°29′04″E
- System: Ningbo Rail Transit station
- Operator: Ningbo Rail Transit Corporation
- Line: Line 3
- Platforms: 2 (2 side platforms)
- Tracks: 2

Construction
- Structure type: Elevated
- Platform levels: 1
- Accessible: Yes

History
- Opened: 28 September 2020

Services
| Preceding station | Ningbo Rail Transit | Following station |
|---|---|---|
| Minghui Road towards Datong Bridge | Line 3 | Fangqiao towards Jinhai Road |
Location

Chaoyang (simplified Chinese: 朝阳; traditional Chinese: 朝陽) is an metro station on Line 3 of the Ningbo Rail Transit. It is located in the Yinzhou District, Ningbo, Zhejiang, China. The station was opened on 30 June 2019.

== Station layout ==
Chaoyang has two levels: a concourse, and two side platforms with two tracks for line 3.

== Entrances/exits ==
- A: Yanhu Road
- B: Chaoyang Village
