= Sports Center station (Ningbo Rail Transit) =

Metro station in Ningbo, China

Sports Center 体育馆
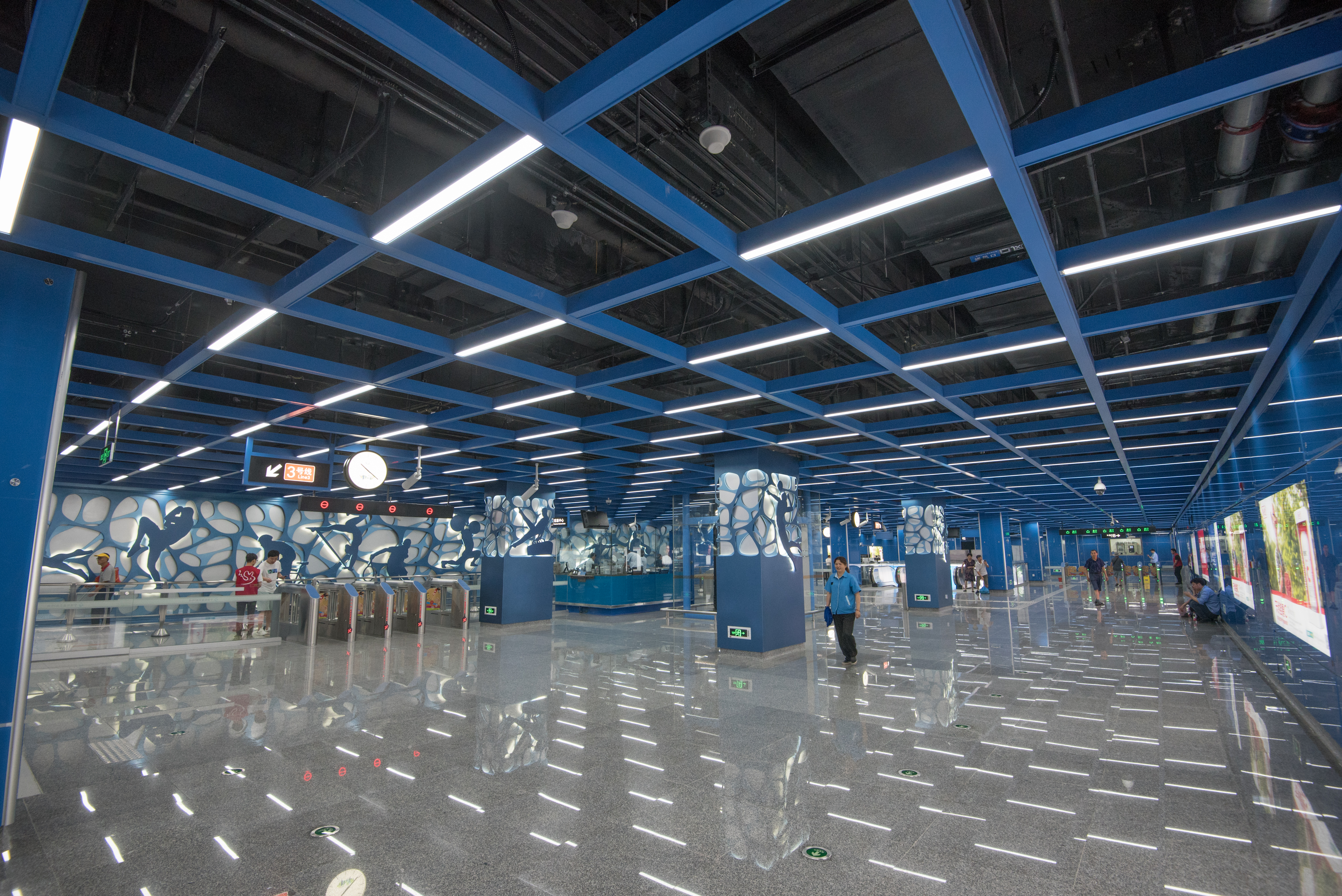
- Sports Center Station, in 30 June 2019

General information
- Location: Zhongxin Road (中兴路) and Jingjia Road (惊驾路); Yinzhou District, Ningbo, Zhejiang; China
- Coordinates: 29°52′28″N 121°34′52″E
- Operated by: Ningbo Rail Transit Co. Ltd.
- Lines: Line 3; Line 7
- Platforms: 2 (1 island platform)

Construction
- Structure type: Underground

History
- Opened: 30 June 2019 (Line 3); 29 August 2025 (Line 7)

Services
Preceding station	Ningbo Rail Transit	Following station
Minglou towards Datong Bridge	Line 3	Sakura Park towards Jinhai Road
Shuguang towards Yufan	Line 7	Fumin Park towards Yunlong
Location

Sports Center station is an underground metro station of Line 3 and Line 7 in Ningbo, Zhejiang, China. It situates on the crossing of Zhongxing Road and Jingjia Road. Line 2 opened on June 30, 2019. Line 7 opened on August 29, 2025.

== Exits ==
Sports Center station has 6 exits.

No	Suggested destinations
A	Zhongxing Road, Jingjia Road
B	Zhongxing Road
D	Zhongxing Road
E	Jingjia Road, Chaohui Road, Ningbo Sports Development Center
F	Jingjia Road, Zhongxing Road
G	Jingjia Road, Zhongxing Road, Ningbo Swimming Fitness Center
