= Sports Center Station =

Sports Center Station may refer to:

- Sports Center Station (Chiba), a station on Line 2 of Chiba Urban Monorail in Chiba, Japan.
- Sports Center station (Luoyang Subway), a station on Line 2 of Luoyang Subway in Luoyang, China.
- Sports Center station (Ningbo Rail Transit), a station on Line 3 of Ningbo Rail Transit in Ningbo, China.
- Sports Center station (Wuhan Metro), a station on Line 3 of Wuhan Metro in Wuhan, China.
- Sports Center station (Shenzhen Metro), a station on Line 6 of Shenzhen Metro in Shenzhen, China.

== See also ==
- Tianhe Sports Center station, a station on Line 1 of the Guangzhou Metro in Guangzhou, China, with a name in Chinese identical to that of the above Sports Center stations
