= Zhongxing Bridge South station =

Metro station in Ningbo, China

Coordinates: 29.89275°N 121.584169°E

Zhongxing Bridge South 中兴大桥南站
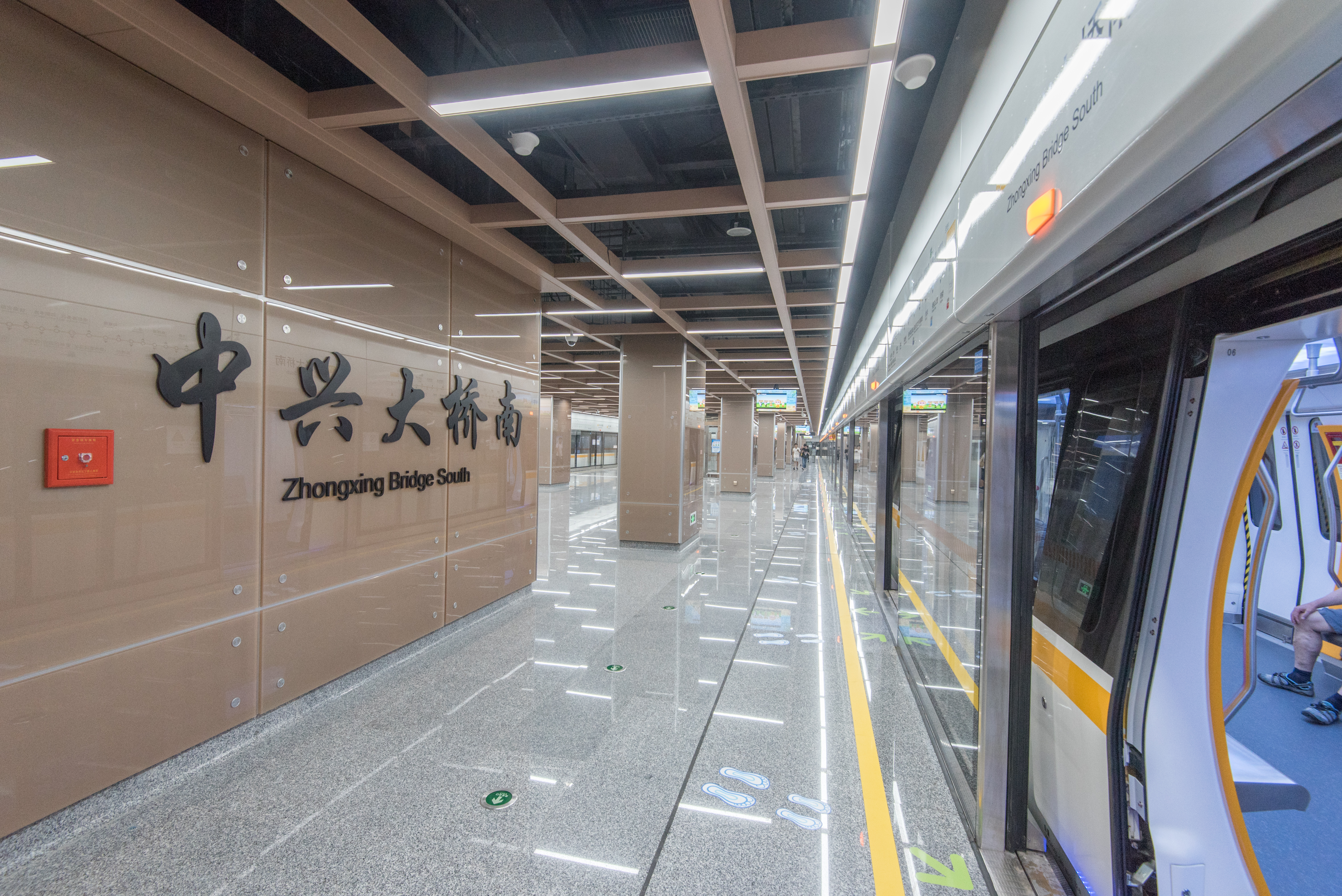
- Zhongxing Bridge South Station，in 30 June 2019

General information
- Location: Yinzhou District, Ningbo, Zhejiang; China
- Operated by: Ningbo Rail Transit Co. Ltd.
- Line(s): Line 3
- Platforms: 2 (1 island platform)

Construction
- Structure type: Underground

History
- Opened: 30 June 2019

Services
Preceding station	Ningbo Rail Transit	Following station
Datong Bridge Terminus	Line 3	Minglou towards Jinhai Road

Zhongxing Bridge South Station is an underground metro station of Line 3 in Ningbo, Zhejiang, China. It is located on the crossing of Zhongxing North Road and Jiangdong North Road north. It opened on 30 June 2019.

== Exits ==
Zhongxing Bridge South Station has two main exits.

Exits	Access
A	Zhongxing North Road, Yongjiang Avenue
B	Zhongxing North Road, Jiangdong North Road
