= Line 3 (Ningbo Rail Transit) =

Metro line in Ningbo, China

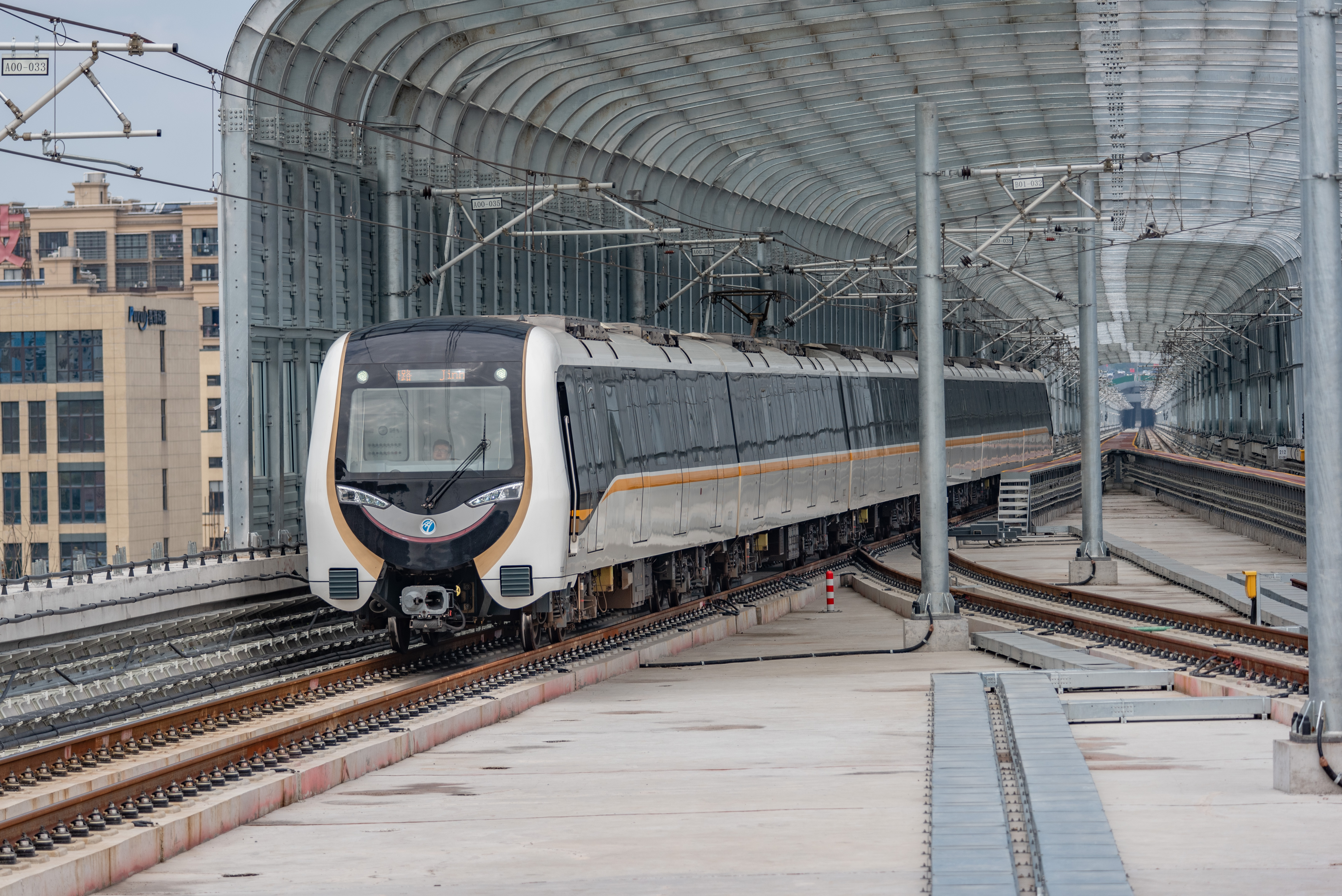
- Line 3 train at Jinhai Road station

Overview
- Other name(s): Ningbo-Fenghua Intercity Railway; Ningfeng Intercity Line; Yinfeng Line
- Status: Operational
- Owner: Ningbo
- Locale: Ningbo, Zhejiang, China
- Termini: Datong Bridge; Jinhai Road
- Stations: 24

Service
- Type: Rapid transit
- System: Ningbo Rail Transit
- Operator(s): Ningbo Rail Transit Co., Ltd.

History
- Opened: 30 June 2019; 7 years ago

Technical
- Line length: 37.45 km (23.27 mi)
- Num of tracks: 2
- Character: Underground
- Track gauge: 1,435 mm (4 ft 8 1/2 in)
- Electrification: Overhead catenary with 1,500 V DC
Route map

Line 3 of Ningbo Rail Transit (Chinese: 宁波轨道交通3号线) is a rapid transit line in Ningbo. It starts from south Fenghua District and ends in Datong Bridge Station in Jiangbei District. In the future extension plan, the line will further extend into Luotuo Area in Zhenhai District. The construction of the first section, from south Yinzhou to Datong Bridge, started on 23 December 2014.

== Route ==
Line 3 starts from Jinhai Road station as an elevated line. It goes north behind the Airport Road until Chaoyang station and turns into east direction on Yanhu Road to Shishan station. Then it turns north again and underground into Gaotang Bridge Station. Then it turns into east–west direction on Yinzhou Avenue and makes a further turn into Ningnan South Road and goes in north–south direction again until it reaches Songjiang Middle Road. Then it runs to northeast to Qiubi and then crosses the Ningbo–Taizhou–Wenzhou railway from which it goes in north–south direction and extends along Zhongxing Road until it crosses Yongjiang River and reaches its destination, Datong Bridge Station.

Phase 2 of line 3 will have 5 more stations north of Datong Bridge, but due to restrictions of an old airport, part of the phase 2 between Datong Bridge and Yongmao Road is stalled for construction. The rest 3 stations of phase 2 has started construction since 2 December 2019, and will temporary run as a part of line 5. Test run of phase 2 of line 3 started on 1 February 2024.

== Opening timeline ==
Segment	Commencement	Length	Station(s)	Name
Datong Bridge — Gaotang Bridge	30 June 2019	16.73 km (10.40 mi)	15	Line 3 (Phase 1)
Gaotang Bridge — Minghui Road	28 September 2019	5.61 km (3.49 mi)	3	Yinfeng Section
Minghui Road — Jinhai Road	27 September 2020	15.92 km (9.89 mi)	6	Yinfeng Section
Luotuo Bridge — Yongmao Road	28 June 2024		3	Phase 2, now temporarily run as a part of Line 5

== Stations ==
=== Phase 1 ===
Service routes			Station name		Connections	Distance km		Location
Local		Rapid	English	Chinese	Connections	Distance km		Location
•	•	•	Datong Bridge	大通桥	2	0.00	0.00	Jiangbei
•	•	•	Zhongxing Bridge South	中兴大桥南		1.72	1.72	Yinzhou
•	•	•	Minglou	明楼	6	1.26	2.98	Yinzhou
•	•	•	Sports Center	体育馆	7	0.98	3.96	Yinzhou
•	•	•	Sakura Park	樱花公园	1	0.96	4.92	Yinzhou
•	•	•	Children's Park	儿童公园	4	1.19	6.11	Yinzhou
•	•	•	Qiubi	仇毕		0.98	7.09	Yinzhou
•	•	•	Qianhu North Road	钱湖北路		1.43	8.52	Yinzhou
•	•	•	Jinyu Road	锦寓路		0.97	9.49	Yinzhou
•	•	•	Siming Middle Road	四明中路		1.17	10.66	Yinzhou
•	•	•	Yinzhou Government	鄞州区政府	5	0.74	11.40	Yinzhou
•	•	•	Southern Business District	南部商务区	8	1.33	12.73	Yinzhou
•		•	Yinzhou Coach Terminal	鄞州客运总站		1.25	13.98	Yinzhou
•		|	Gouzhang Road	句章路		1.34	15.32	Yinzhou
•		|	Gaotang Bridge	高塘桥		0.82	16.14	Yinzhou
•		•	Jiangshan	姜山		1.73	17.87	
•		|	Shishan	狮山		1.35	19.22	
•		|	Minghui Road	明辉路		1.31	20.53	
•		|	Chaoyang	朝阳		1.88	22.41	
•		•	Fangqiao	方桥		4.46	26.87	Fenghua
•		|	Jinlin	琎琳		2.58	29.45	Fenghua
•		|	Nandu	南渡		1.61	31.06	Fenghua
•		•	Dacheng East Road	大成东路		4.04	35.10	Fenghua
•		•	Jinhai Road	金海路		2.35	37.45	Fenghua

=== Phase 2 ===
See Line 5 (Ningbo Rail Transit)#Stations.
