= Datong Bridge station =

Metro station in Ningbo, China

Datong Bridge 大通桥
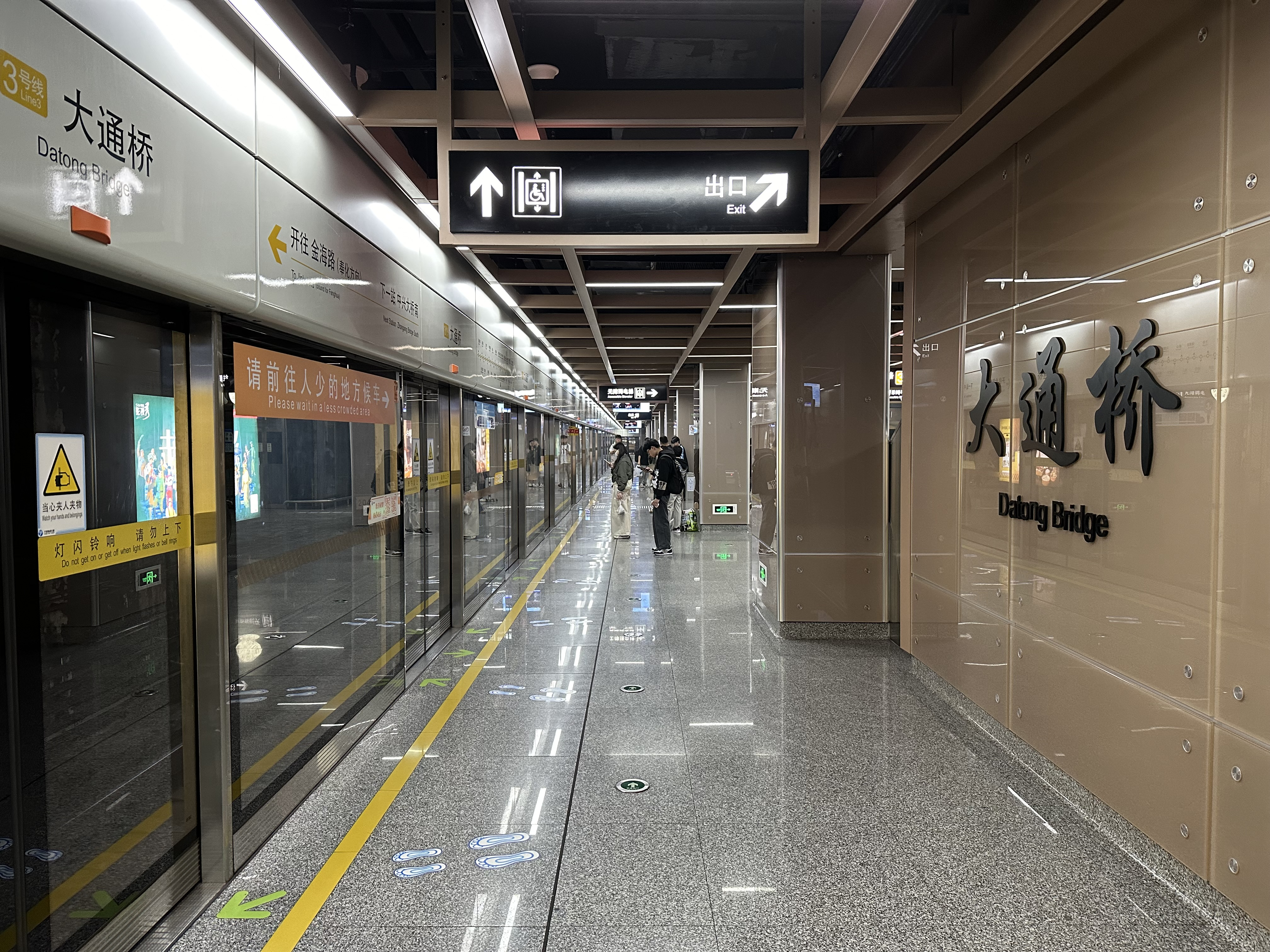
- Platform of Line 3

Chinese name
- Simplified Chinese: 大通桥站
- Traditional Chinese: 大通橋站
Transcriptions
Standard Mandarin
- Hanyu Pinyin: Dàtōngqiáo Zhàn

General information
- Location: Shuyun Road (舒云路) × Zhongxing North Road (中兴北路); Jiangbei District, Ningbo, Zhejiang; China
- Coordinates: 29°54′23.76″N 121°34′39.49″E
- System: Ningbo Rail Transit
- Operator: Ningbo Rail Transit Co. Ltd.
- Lines: Line 2 Line 3
- Platforms: 4 (2 island platforms)
- Tracks: 4

Construction
- Structure type: Underground
- Platform levels: 2
- Accessible: Yes

History
- Opened: 26 September 2015

Services
Preceding station	Ningbo Rail Transit	Following station
Yasaiyan towards Lishe International Airport	Line 2	Kongpu towards Honglian
Terminus	Line 3	Zhongxing Bridge South towards Jinhai Road
Location

Datong Bridge (Chinese: 大通桥) is an underground metro station of Line 2 and Line 3 in Ningbo, Zhejiang, China. It situates on the crossing of Qingyun Road and Jintang Road. Construction of the station started in late 2010 and opened to service in September 26, 2015. In June 2019, Datong Bridge Station became a transfer station between Line 2 and Line 3.

== Exits ==
Datong Bridge Station has 4 exits.

- A: Datong North Road (大通北路)
- B: Zhongxing North Road
- C: Zhongxing North Road, Cangchu Road (仓储路)
- D: Shuyun Road
- E: Shuyun Road
- F: Zhongxing North Road, Huancheng North Road (环城北路)
