= Jinhai Road station (Ningbo Rail Transit) =

Metro station in Fenghua, Ningbo, China

Jinhai Road 金海路
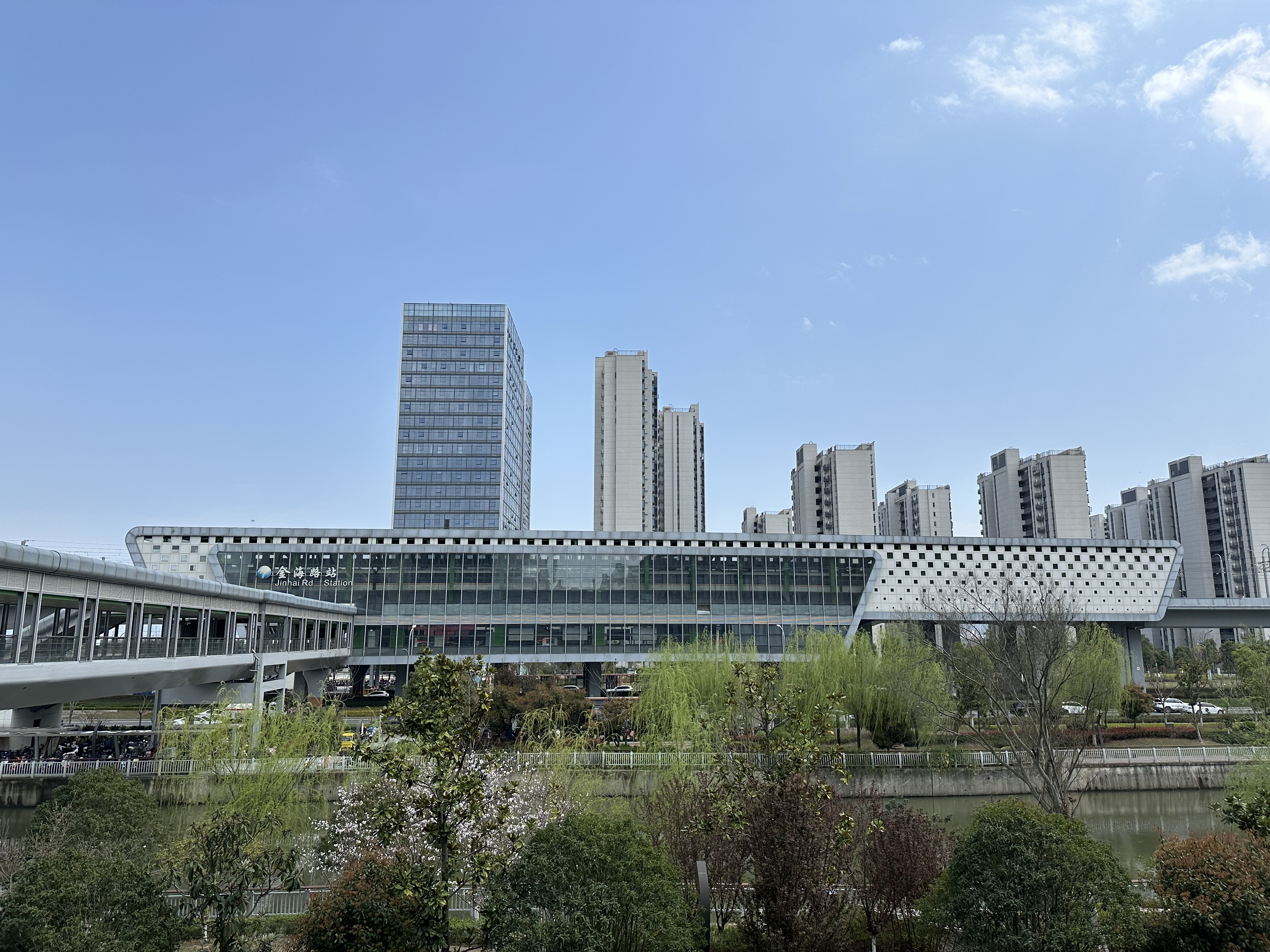
- Station exterior

General information
- Location: Airport South Road × Jinhai Road; Fenghua District, Ningbo, Zhejiang; China
- Coordinates: 29°39′14″N 121°26′41″E
- System: Ningbo Rail Transit station
- Operator: Ningbo Rail Transit Corporation
- Line: Line 3
- Platforms: 2 (1 island platform)
- Tracks: 2

Construction
- Structure type: Elevated
- Platform levels: 1
- Accessible: Yes

History
- Opened: 28 September 2020

Services
Preceding station	Ningbo Rail Transit	Following station
Dacheng East Road towards Datong Bridge	Line 3	Terminus
Location

Jinhai Road (Chinese: 金海路) is an metro station on Line 3 of the Ningbo Rail Transit. It is located in the Fenghua District, Ningbo, Zhejiang, China. The station was opened on 30 June 2019.

== Station layout ==
Jinhai Road has two levels: a concourse, and an island platform with two tracks for line 3.

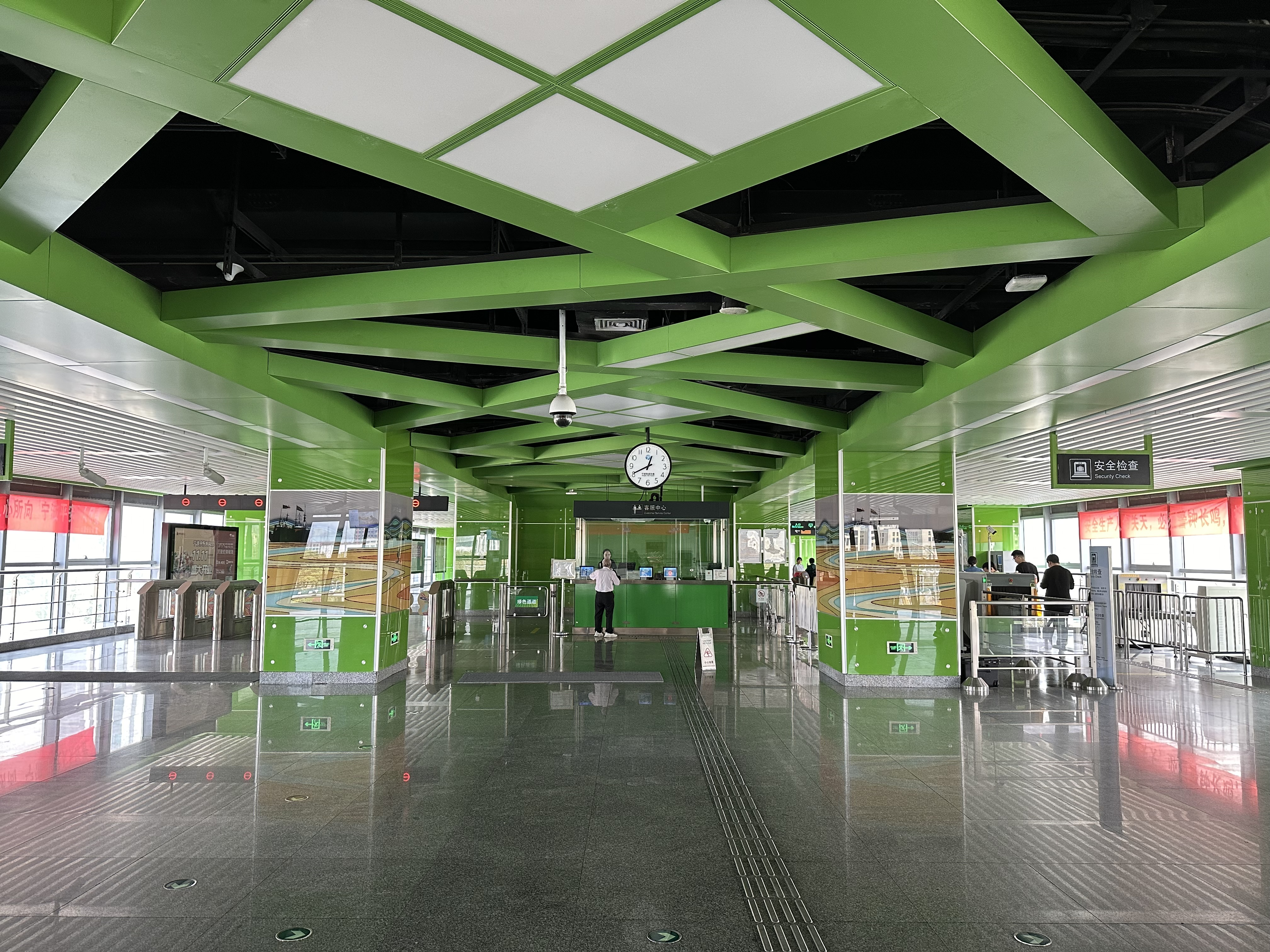
Concourse

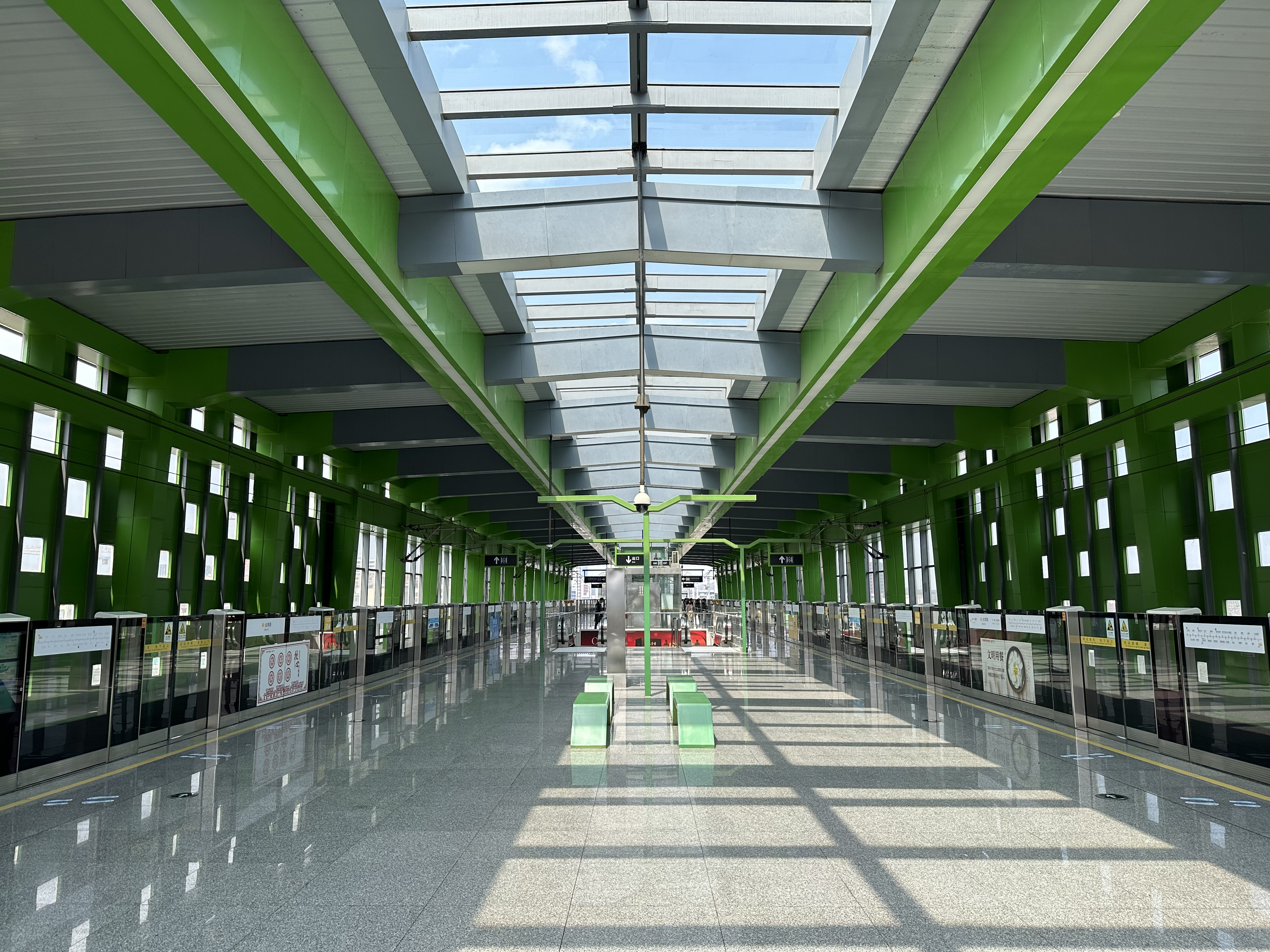
Platforms

== Entrances/exits ==
- A: Airport South Road, Jinhai Road
- B1: Airport South Road, Jinhai Road
- B2: Fenghua Coach Center
