= Fuqing North Road station =

Ningbo Metro station

Coordinates: 29.8614°N 121.6201°E

Fuqing North Road 福庆北路
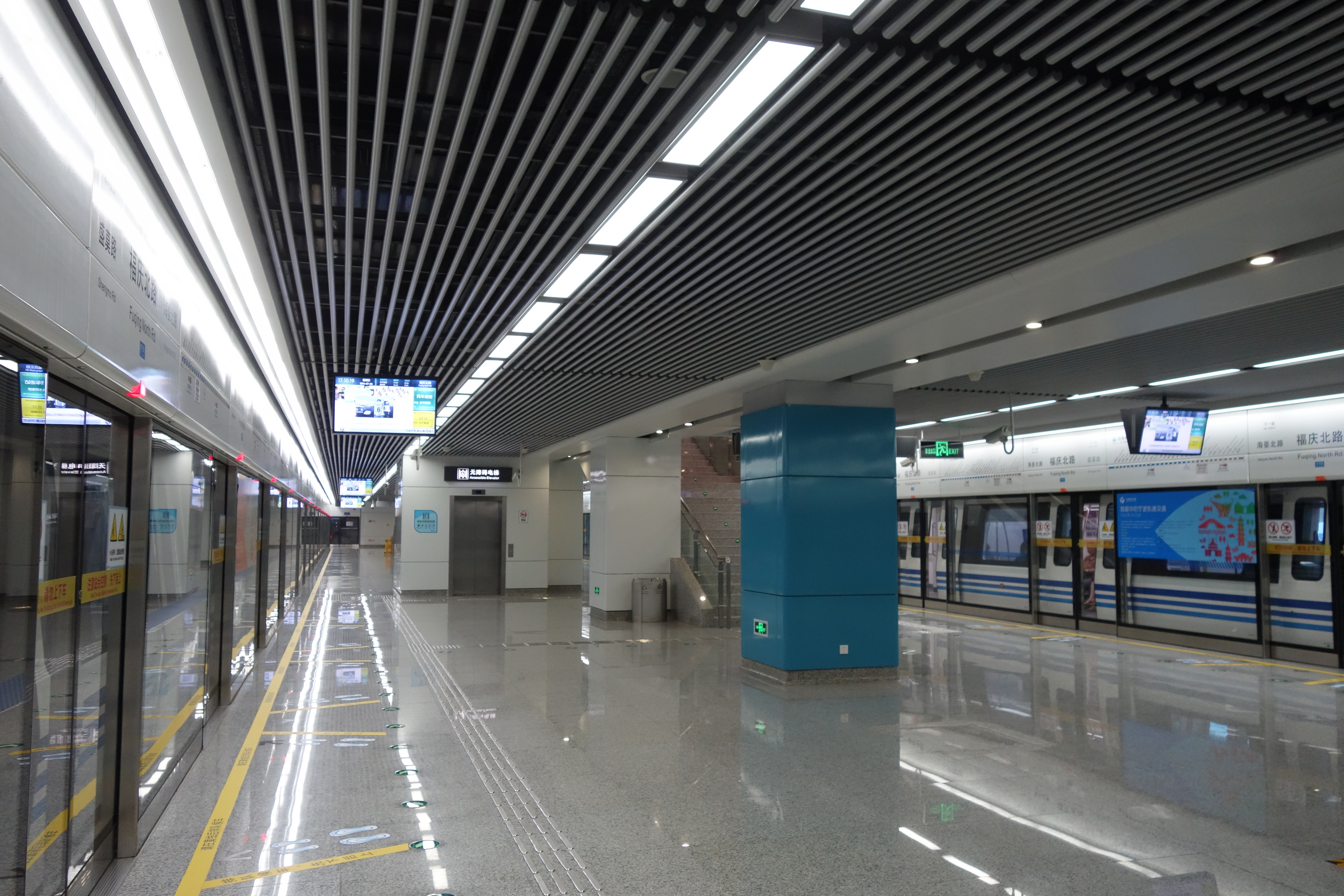

General information
- Location: Yinzhou District, Ningbo, Zhejiang; China
- Operated by: Ningbo Rail Transit Co. Ltd.
- Line: Line 1
- Platforms: 2 (1 island platform)

Construction
- Structure type: Underground

History
- Opened: 30 May 2014

Services
Preceding station	Ningbo Rail Transit	Following station
Haiyan North Road towards Gaoqiao West	Line 1	Shengmo Road towards Xiapu
Location

Fuqing North Road Station (simplified Chinese: 福庆北路站; traditional Chinese: 福慶北路站; pinyin: Fúqìng Běilù Zhàn) is a metro station on Line 1 of the Ningbo Rail Transit that started operations on 30 May 2014. It is situated under Zhongshan East Road (Chinese: 中山东路) in Yinzhou District of Ningbo City, Zhejiang Province, eastern China.

== Exits ==
Exit number	Exit location
Exit A	Ningchuan Road, Fuqing North Road, Ningbo Government Square
Exit B	Ningchuan Road, Heqing North Road, Entrance No. 1 of Ningbo Government
