= Qingfangcheng station =

Ningbo Metro station

Coordinates: 29.8315°N 121.5141°E

Qingfangcheng 轻纺城
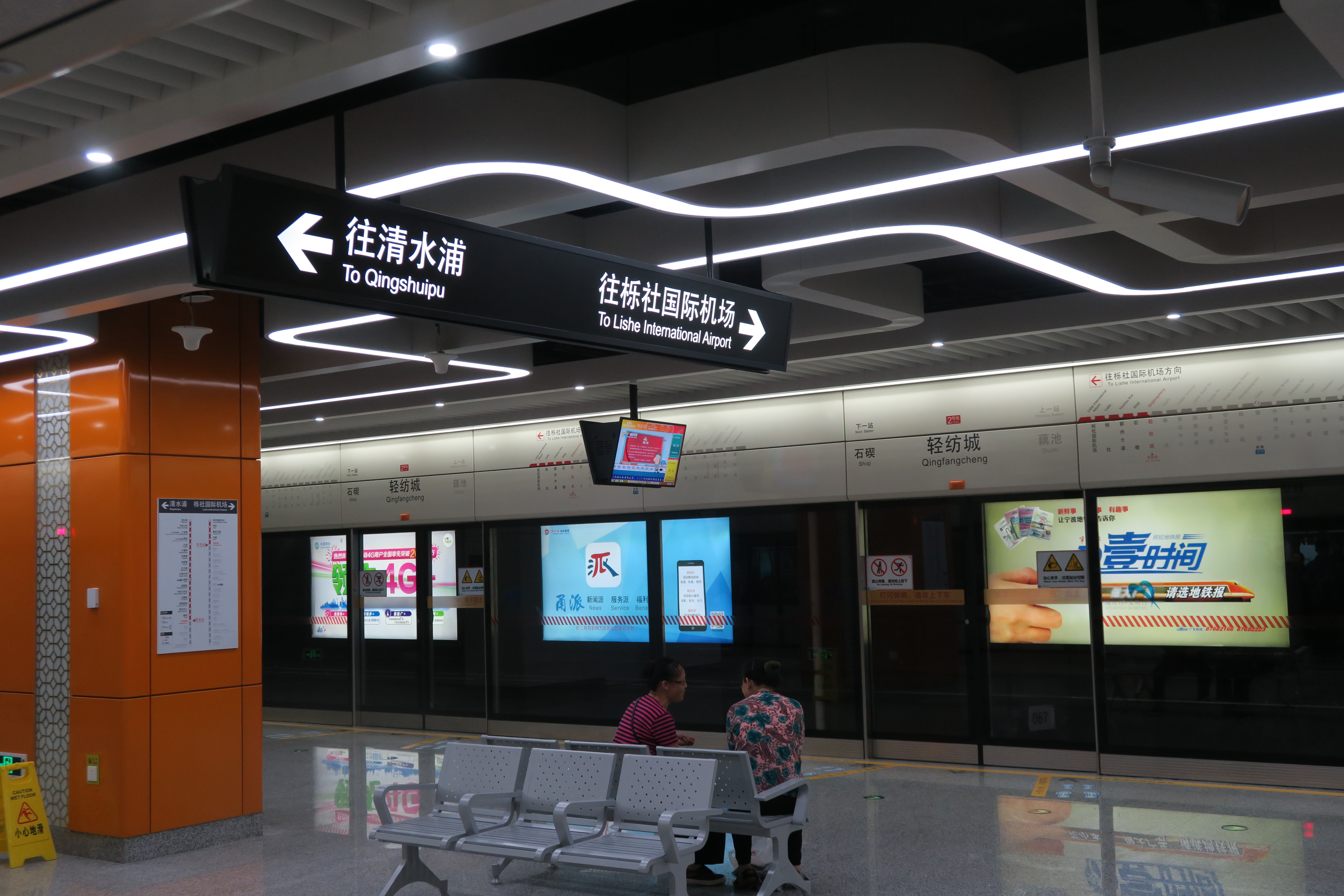

General information
- Location: Yinzhou District, Ningbo, Zhejiang; China
- Operated by: Ningbo Rail Transit Co. Ltd.
- Line(s): Line 2
- Platforms: 2 (1 island platform)

Construction
- Structure type: Underground

History
- Opened: September 26, 2015

Services
Preceding station	Ningbo Rail Transit	Following station
Shiqi towards Lishe International Airport	Line 2	Ouchi towards Honglian

Qingfangcheng station (Chinese: 轻纺城站), is an underground metro station in Ningbo, Zhejiang, China. It is located at the intersection of Yage'er Avenue and Wancheng Road. Construction of the station started in December 2010 and opened to service on September 26, 2015.

== Exits ==
Qingfangcheng Station has 3 exits.

No	Suggested destinations
A	Yage'er Avenue, Yinzhou Avenue
B	Wancheng Road
D	Yage'er Avenue
