= Pneumatic vehicle =

Pneumatic vehicle may refer to:

- Compressed-air vehicle
- Pneumatic tube
- Beach Pneumatic Transit
- London Pneumatic Despatch Company
- Crystal Palace pneumatic railway
- Atmospheric railway
