= Rammell =

Surname

Rammell is a surname. Notable people with the surname include:

- Amanda Rammell (born 1985), beauty queen from Rexburg, Idaho
- Andy Rammell (born 1967), former professional footballer
- Bill Rammell (born 1959), British Labour Party politician, Minister of State for the Armed Forces at the Ministry of Defence
- Rex Rammell, conservative politician from Idaho
- Thomas Webster Rammell (died 1879), British engineer

== See also ==
- Rammell Mountain (10,121 feet (3,085 m), in the Teton Range in the U.S. state of Wyoming
