= Prague pneumatic post =

System of delivery in the capital of the Czech Republic

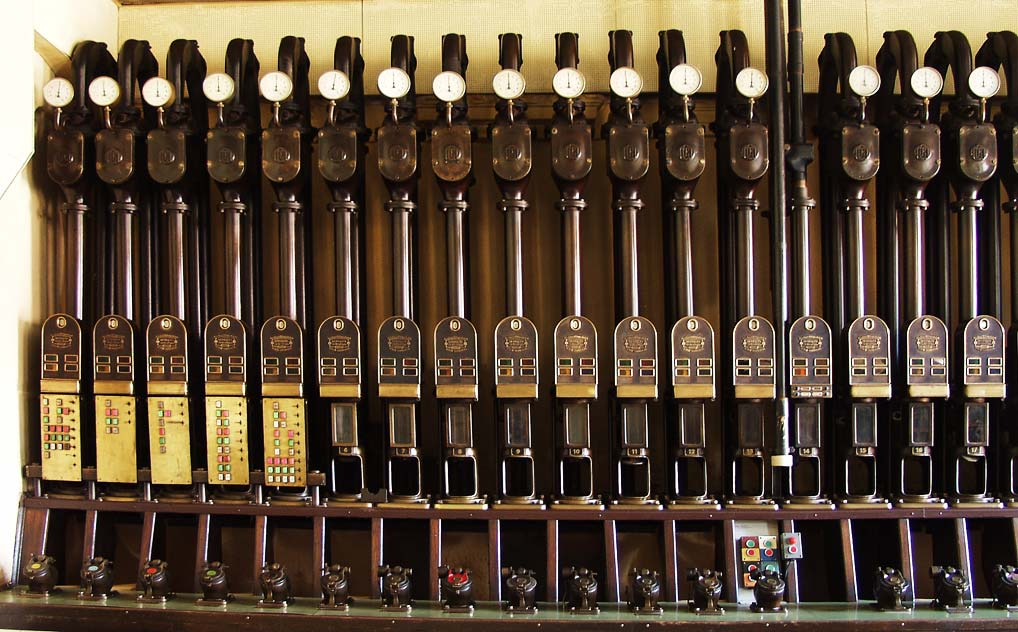
Main control panel, showing the inlets, outlets and lane controllers

Prague pneumatic post (Czech: Pražská potrubní pošta) is the world's last preserved municipal pneumatic post system. It is an underground system of metal tubes under the wider centre of Prague, totaling about 55 km (34 miles) in length. The system started service in 1889 and remained in use by the government, banks and the media until it was rendered inoperative by the August 2002 European floods.

Sold on by former owner Telefónica O2 Czech Republic after some limited attempts to make repairs, the system now belongs to businessman Zdeněk Dražil, who has announced plans to repair and reopen it as a working tourist attraction. As of 2017, however, it remains closed.

== History ==
The Prague pneumatic post system entered public service on 4 March 1889. The first lane was constructed as early as 1887, but was used only for internal postal business at first. It ran from the main post office on Jindřišská street (next to Wenceslas Square) to the post bureau at Malé náměstí (next to Old Town Square) in Old Town. (This bureau was situated in a corner house with Linhartská street, belonging to the V. J. Rott company, next to a house that is called 'U Rotta' today.) The first lane was later extended as far as Prague Castle, making it over 5 km long. Prague was the fifth city in the world to receive a pneumatic post system after London, Vienna, Berlin, and Paris, which was considered a major achievement for Prague.

The system was initially employed mainly for sending telegrams. In 1901 there were only three stations between the main Prague post office and the telegraph office.

The system was established for express delivery of documents. A given document would be taken to the post office, rolled up into a metal capsule and dropped down a hatch leading to a selected location. After the clerk pressed a button, the capsule would be moved by compressed air along a network of tubes beneath the pavement.

The network experienced its greatest growth in the years of economic prosperity between 1927 and 1932. In those years, new lanes were constructed and tens of thousands of capsules were transported every month. During the Prague Uprising, the pneumatic post played a role in supplying the besieged building of the Czech radio.

In the late 1990s, the system was used by more than 20 subscribers and was operating at a loss, remaining in operation as a prestige project rather than as a business. Traffic gradually declined and the system was seriously damaged by floods in 2002, submerging 5 of 11 underground engine rooms.

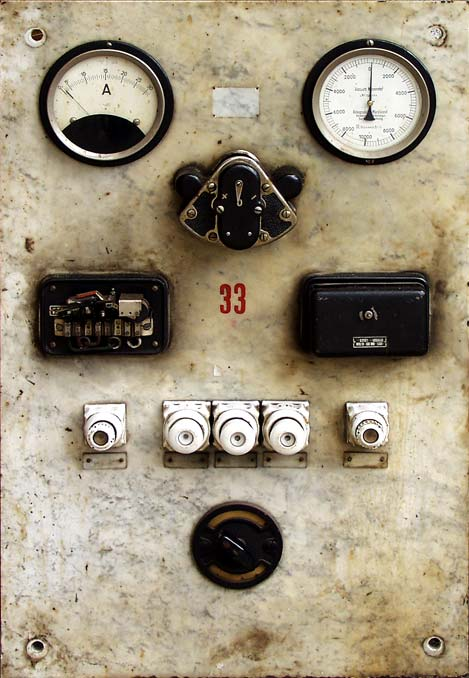
Air-pump control panel, with an ammeter and a manometer set in a marble slab

== Pipes ==
The lanes consist of steel pipes of 65 mm bore and wall thickness of 2.5–3 mm. The pipes are connected with tight couplers 14 cm long to ensure perfect coaxial alignment and then welded together, ensuring air-tightness. To prevent stray voltage from causing excess corrosion, ceramic insulators are inserted between the pipe segments at some places. Pipes buried underground are protected from the outside by a layer of fiberglass, wound around at increased temperature and coated with hot asphalt. The pipeline is typically buried under the Prague pavements 80–120 cm deep. Inside buildings and in the Prague trunk conduit network the pipes are simply coated with anti-corrosive paint.

The minimum bend radius is 250 cm for underground pipes, but 300 cm is the most commonly used radius. Inside buildings a bend radius as low as 200 cm is allowed. The bends are made of special annealed pipes at normal temperature, using a custom-made bender.

A signaling cable is laid along with the pipe, enabling communication with the track components.

The lane segments are equipped with dumb wells, where the pipeline can be opened and inspected, or a stuck capsule removed. For this purpose, a heavier capsule can be sent at a pressure of up to 30 atm, knocking the stuck capsule out.

== Transport capsule ==
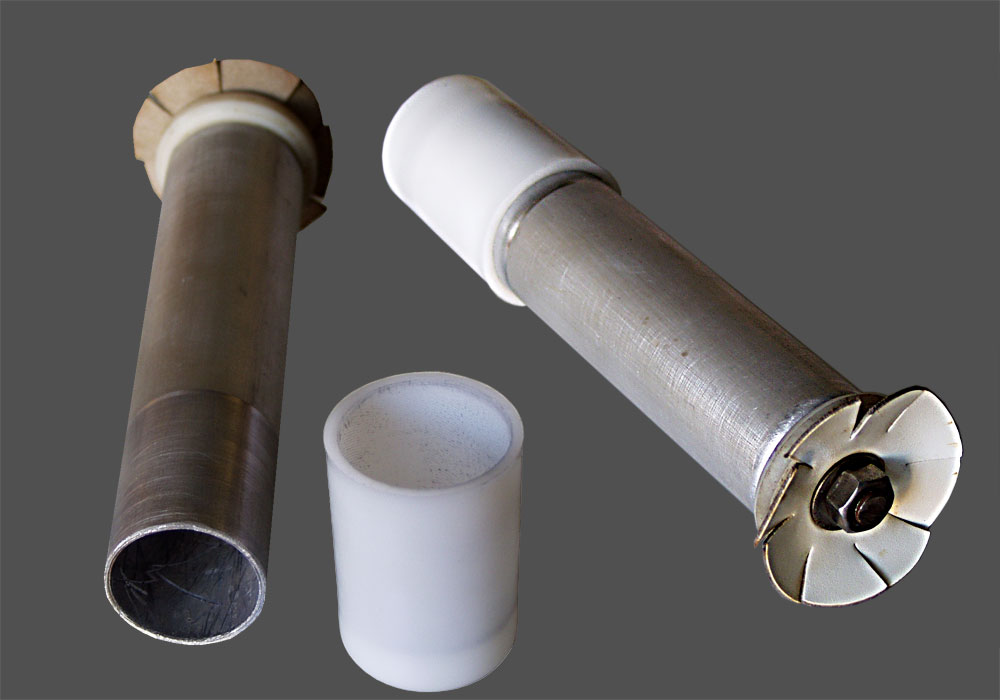
A capsule for transporting packages using the Prague pneumatic post network

The system uses aluminium capsules measuring 48 mm in outer-diameter and 200 mm in length. On the rear end they are fitted with a plastic circlet, preventing friction against walls of the pipe and a soft plastic skirt, sealing air behind the capsule. The diameter of the rear circlet is 57 mm. The remaining 8 mm of the bore are sealed just by the skirt, allowing for excellent airtightness and low friction at the same time.

== Propulsion units ==
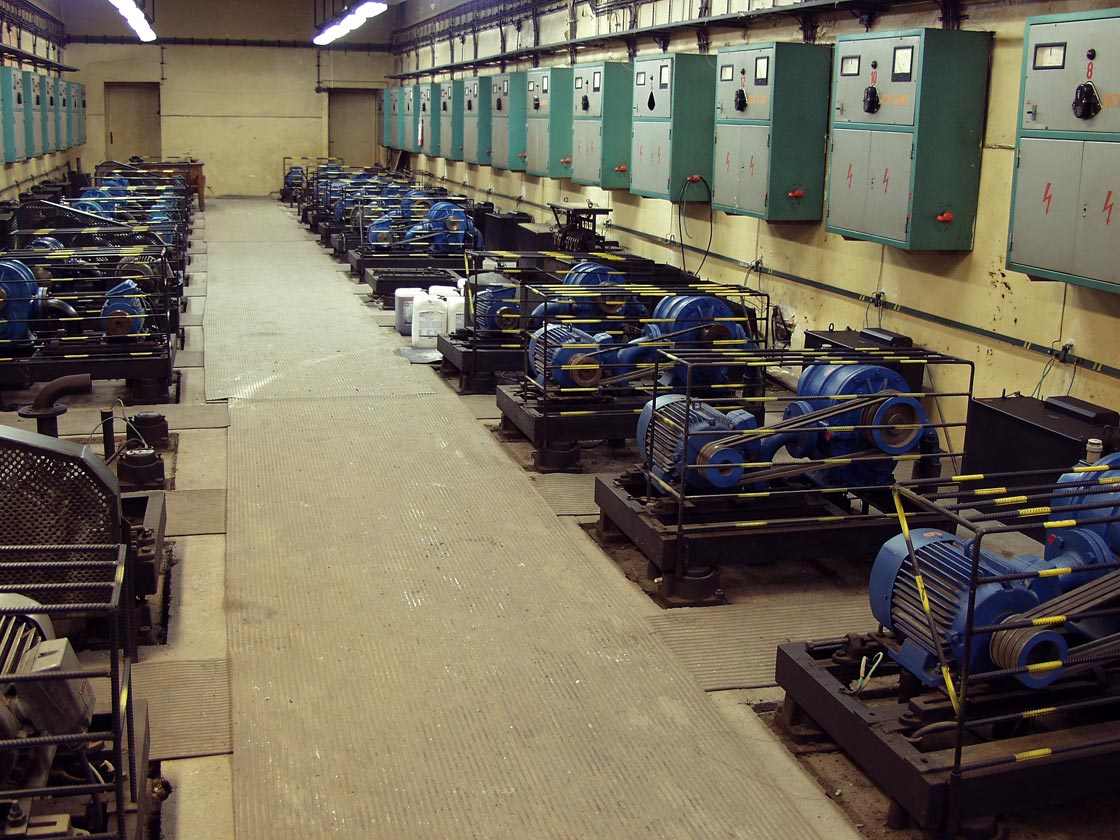
Engine room in the main post office building in Jindřišská Street at 50°5′0.04″N 14°25′40.6″E

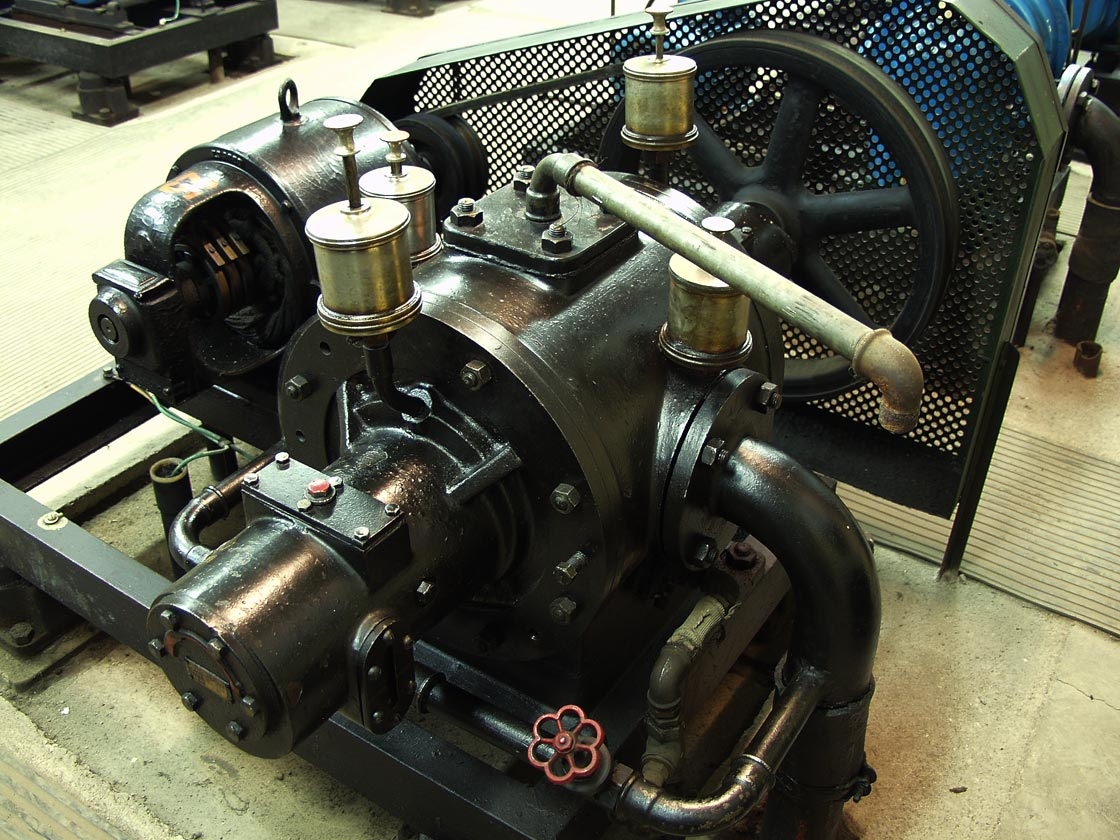
Original bladed air pump from the 1930s

Each lane is equipped with a dedicated propulsion unit, consisting of an electrically-powered air pump. One pump can service at most 3 km of pipeline, so it's necessary to use several pumps on longer lanes.

The pumps must be reversible, creating either pressure or vacuum. The pumps are connected to the pipes with tee-fittings. On both sides of the tee the pipe is equipped with switches activated by a passing capsule.

At first the pump is set to intake mode, pulling the capsule towards the tee. Before reaching it, the capsule hits the first switch, causing the pump to start reversing. Meanwhile, the capsule reaches the tee-fitting. As it passes the tee, the pump is already fully reversed and starts to push the capsule away.

The older pumps were bladed, having a single blade, mounted eccentrically inside a 300 mm high cylinder. More recent pumps employ a rotating piston instead.

== Packages ==
The capsules can be loaded with packages up to 5 cm in diameter and 30 cm in length. Their weight can be up to 3 kg. Generally these were rolled-up telegrams, but any package within the set limits could be transported.

Dangerous and corrosive substances, which could damage the pipeline, were banned. On the other hand, the travel speed could be adjusted, allowing for transporting fragile packages.

== Lanes and stations ==
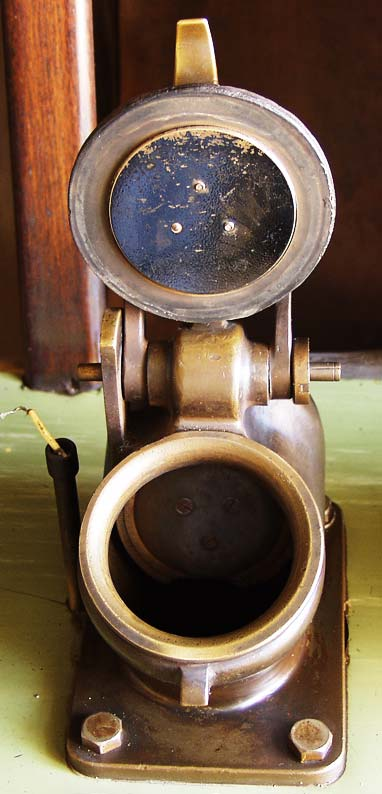
Lane input hatch, where the capsules were inserted

Prague pneumatic post network consists of five main lanes arranged in a star topology, fitted with switches and concentrators, and of subscriber's lines. The total length of the lanes is about 55 km. Some of the most frequented segments have two pipes (one for each direction), but the majority of the lanes use a single pipe and the direction is determined by setting up the pumps to run in the desired direction. The main lanes connect the following post offices and bureaus:

- Jindřišská – Prague 2, Prague 3, Prague 10
- Jindřišská – Prague 1, Prague 2
- Jindřišská – Prague 5
- Jindřišská – Prague 6
- Jindřišská – Prague 7

Originally there were 16 subscriber's lines, but only 7 have been preserved to this day. A total of 24 pneumatic post stations remain today.

The network crosses the river Vltava in three spots making use of bridges (Hlávkův Bridge, Mánes Bridge, and Legion Bridge).

== Headquarters/switchboard ==
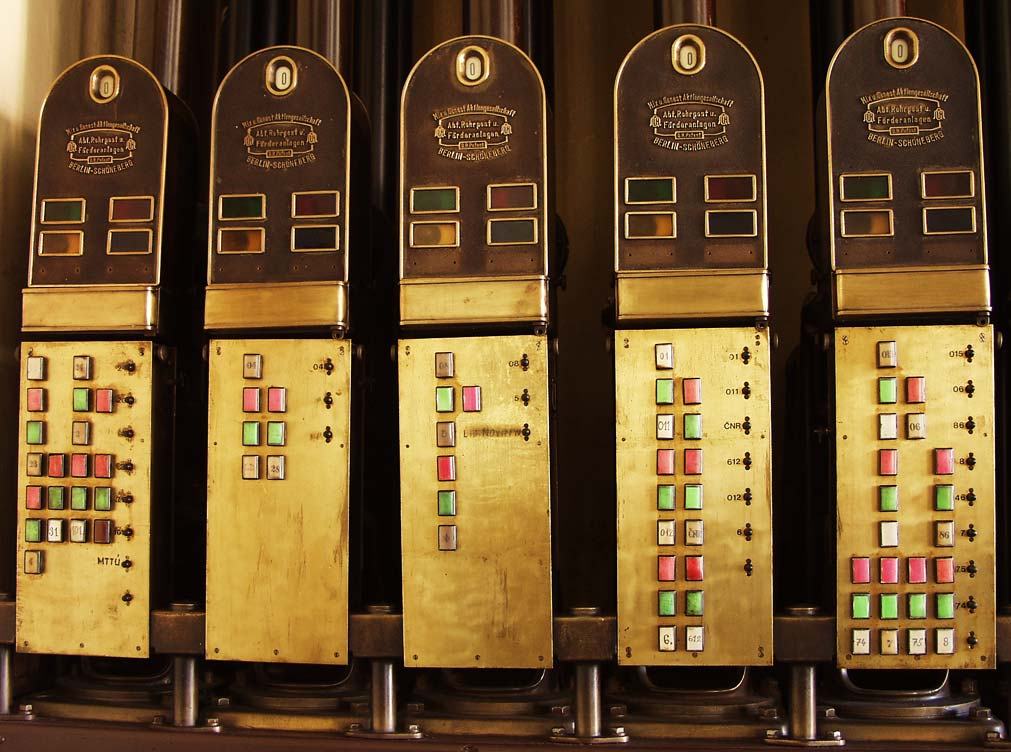
Controllers of the five main lanes with counters, indicator lights, and switch controls

All the lanes converge to the main post office in Jindřišská Street. Here, all the packages were carefully recorded and from here the network was controlled and monitored. This is also the place where the packages were forwarded from one lane to another. The capsule was picked up from a receiving pocket by a member of staff, recorded and inserted into the inlet of another lane.

The current lane state was indicated by indicator lights on the lane's controller. Up to 10 packages at 30-second intervals could be sent on the same lane at once, although this was rarely used in practice.

When sending capsules to switched lanes, the capsules had to be sent out in a predefined order, as the switches could only be activated before commencing the transfer. The first capsule would be diverted, after which the switch would automatically slide back to its neutral position, sending the remaining capsules in the straight direction. Therefore, the capsule that was meant to branch off had to be sent first.
