= Rohrpost in Berlin =

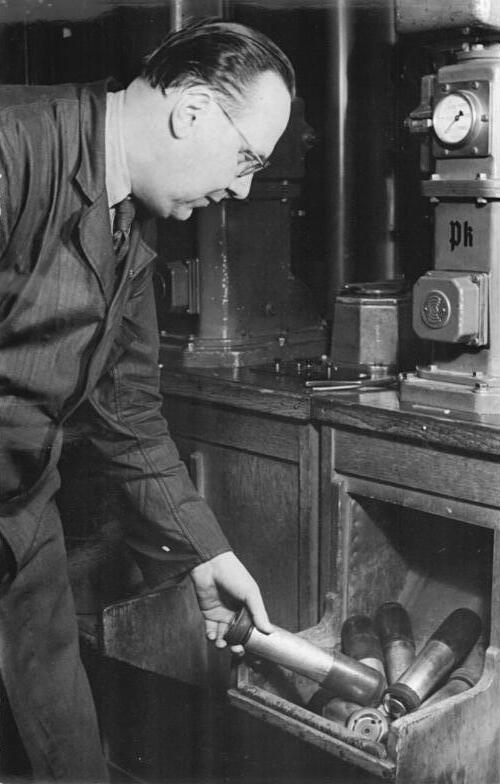
Central Berlin Pneumatic Despatch in Oranienburger Straße (1951)

The Rohrpost (German: [ˈʁoːɐ̯ˌpɔst]) in Berlin, was a pneumatic tube postal service, which existed from 18 November 1865 until 1963 in West Berlin and in East Berlin until 1976.

== History ==
=== Early history ===
In 1861, a pneumatic tube system was installed in the Central Telegraph Office of London to transport telegrams. Inspired by this, the Royal Prussian Telegraph Office placed an order with Siemens & Halske to build a pneumatic tube system for Berlin. The operation of the first line of the Pneumatic Dispatching System was started on November 18, 1865, and ran between the first Hauptelegraphenamt and the telegraph station in the Berliner Börse. Thus the pneumatic delivery system enabled the fast transport of stock exchange quotations that arrived at the main telegraph office from Germany and abroad or were to be sent out into the world from Berliner Börse.

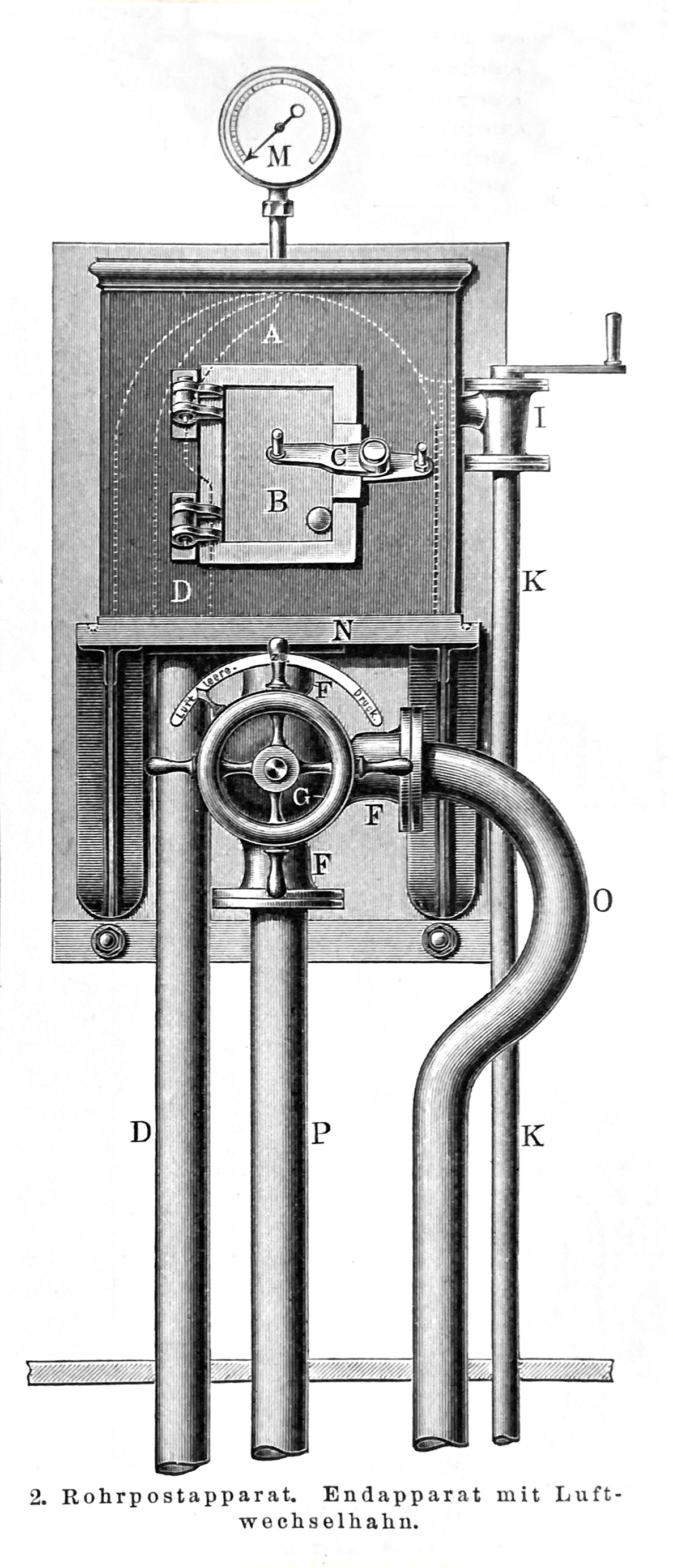
Functional principle of a pneumatic post terminal apparatus with air exchange cock (around 1900): The barrel tube D opens into the chamber A, whose door B with a rubber seal can be closed airtight by the pressure lever C. The chamber can be connected to the pressure pipe O or the suction pipe P by the air exchange cock F. It is moved by the hand wheel G with a pointer to the positions indicated on the brass plate of the table top N. The chamber can be ventilated by means of the air cock I via the external air pipe K. The pressure gauge M is used to check the air pressure.

In March 1868 the telegraph offices IV at the Brandenburg Gate and V at Potsdamer Platz were connected to the network, which was now 18 km long. On December 1, 1876, the network, which had been extended to 15 pneumatic post offices with a total length of 25.9 km, was opened to the general public. Postcards and letters up to a weight of 20 grams (maximum size: 14 cm × 9 cm) could be sent.

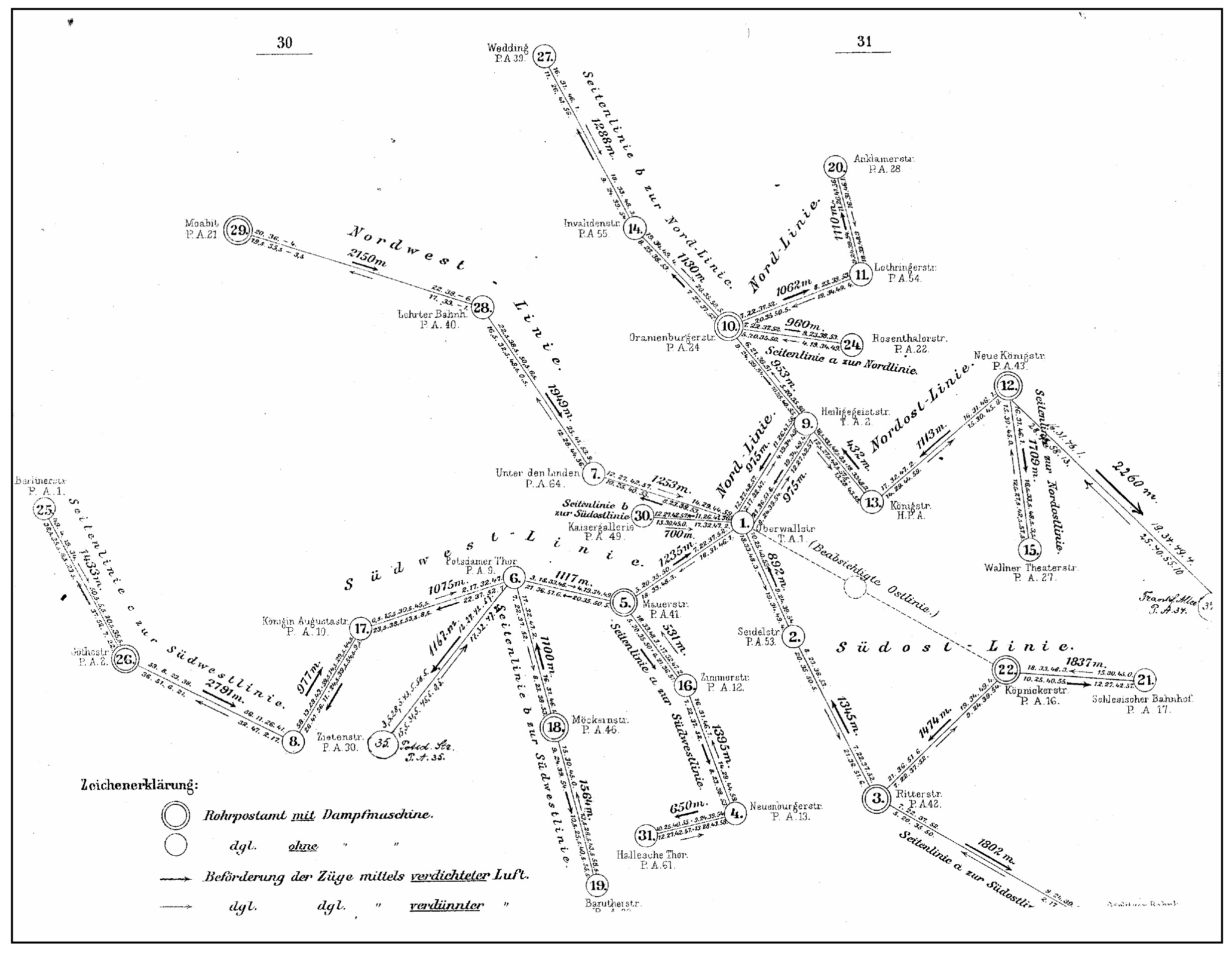
Development of the network of the Berlin pneumatic post according to the operating regulations of 1885

=== Development until 1945 ===
In 1940, the Berlin pneumatic post network reached its greatest expansion with a maximum route length of almost 400 km. 79 post and telegraph offices were connected and at that time processed about 8 million shipments annually. The operation of the Berliner Rohrpost as a publicly accessible system of message transmission was finally discontinued in 1976. In East Berlin, telegrams were still delivered to the delivery offices by pneumatic post until 1986. An analysis of the route plan of the Berliner Rohrpost shows that the development of the network first served economic interests. It was the connection between the main telegraph office and the stock exchange, which was followed by the expansion of the pneumatic delivery network into the newspaper district and the banking district of Berlin. Later even the sparsely populated upper and lower middle-class residential districts as well as the villa areas of the West were connected (Charlottenburg, Grunewald, Lichterfelde, Schöneberg, Wilmersdorf, Zehlendorf), while the pronounced working-class districts (Kreuzberg, Lichtenberg, Neukölln, Wedding) and the formerly clearly rural urban districts on the periphery received little or no coverage by pneumatic postal network.

=== Postal service and destruction until May 8th, 1945 ===
Parts of the pneumatic postal network were destroyed or damaged during the Second World War due allied air raids on Berlin. However, the operation of some pneumatic post lines in the centre of Berlin is documented until the end of March 1945. The pneumatic post in Berlin remained in operation "de jure" until the surrender of the German Wehrmacht on May 8, 1945. The express delivery service of the post office, on the other hand, was discontinued on August 14, 1944, due to a shortage of personnel and an extremely increased volume of mail.

=== State on May 8th, 1945 ===
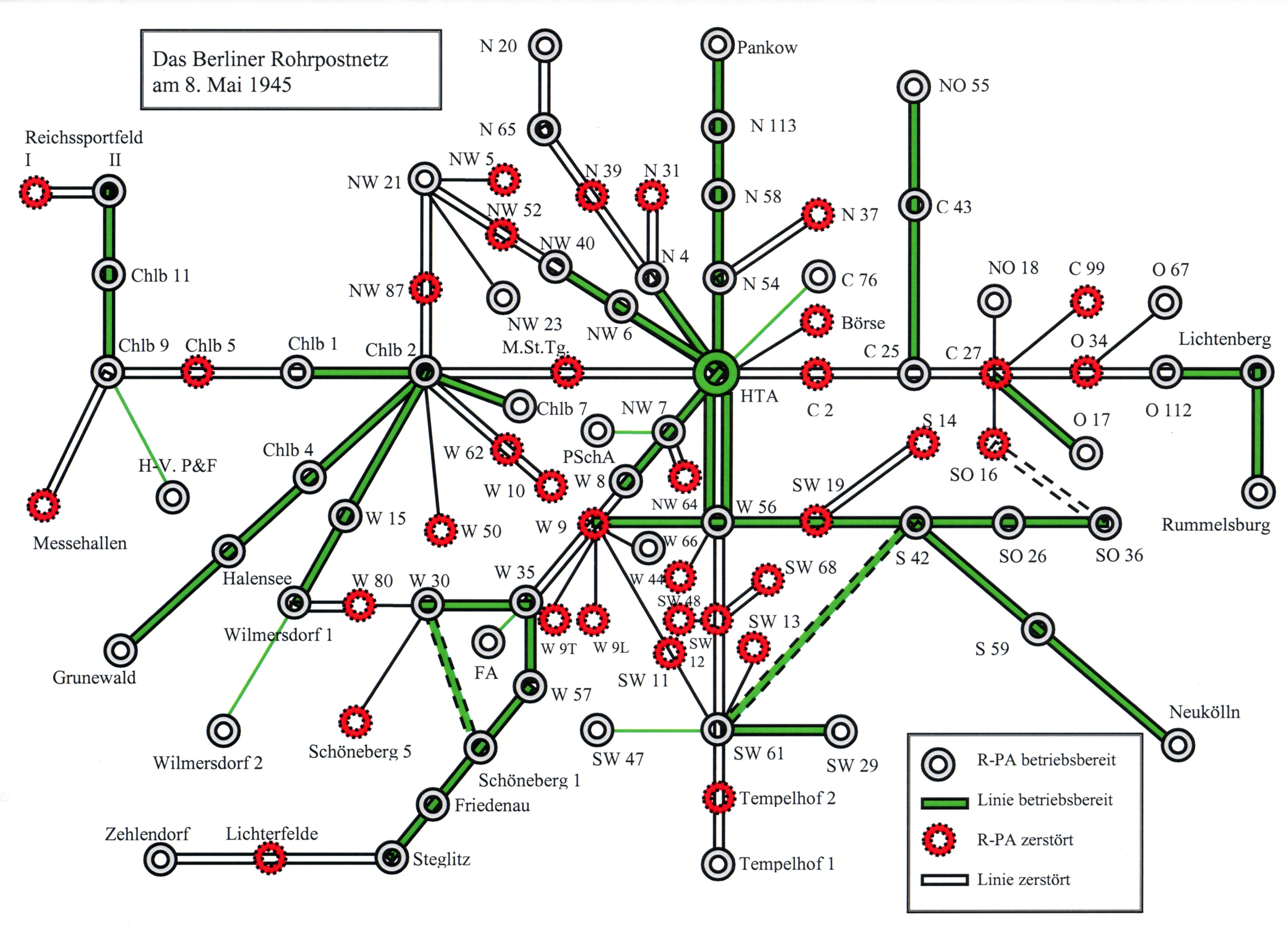
Schematic representation of the destruction of the Berlin pneumatic post network on 8th May 1945

=== Development since 1945 ===
The effects of the war, illegal dismantling for the production of waste materials, dismantling for reparations and weather influences left only a torso of the once large pneumatic post network after May 8th 1945. The re-establishment of the pneumatic post network can be proved by the fact that an increasing number of telegrams arriving in Berlin - according to the original function of the pneumatic post network - were transported by pneumatic post. Shown is a postage-free service envelope of the Berlin pneumatic post, which was used up in 1946 due to the general lack of material as an envelope of a service consignment of the telegraph construction office. The use of this envelope at that time by the Berlin pneumatic post, which at that time was not yet accessible to the public and was largely destroyed during the war, can only be proven when the date of the start of operation of the connection between Berlin W 35 and Berlin-Wilmersdorf has been determined. The letter should have been transported with pneumatic post from W 35 via W 30, W 80 to Berlin-Wilmersdorf 1. However, the pneumatic post office W 80 was destroyed, so that it is questionable whether the letter could have been transported by pneumatic post. An alternative would have been the connection from W 35 via W 9, W 8, NW 7, HTA, Berlin-Charlottenburg 2, W 15 to Berlin-Wilmersdorf 1. However, since the pneumatic delivery system of W 9 and the machine station Tiergarten, which was on the way, were destroyed, this connection might not have been passable. So the transport of this letter by pneumatic post can be largely excluded.

In the meantime it is known that in December 1945 the line between the Main Telegraph Office and Berlin N 54, and in early 1946 the line between Berlin N 4 and Berlin C 25 as well as between the Main Telegraph Office and Berlin-Pankow (via Berlin N 54, Berlin N 58 and Berlin N 113) were opened. Since 1946, incoming telegrams and presumably also express mail were increasingly transported between the offices and especially to the delivery offices on the restored pneumatic tube lines. Such telegrams usually have a pink adhesive label with the inscription Rohrpost / Eilbote, but no minute stamp. These labels had already been introduced on April 9, 1936.

In detail, the use of the Berlin pneumatic post network between 1946 and 1948, measured by the example of the telegrams transported by pneumatic post, is as follows:

| Telegrams | from Berlin | to Berlin | total |
|---|---|---|---|
| 1946 | 452.882 | 450.015 | 902.897 |
| 1947 | 1.646.369 | 908.418 | 2.545.787 |
| 1948 | 1.256.428 | 739.725 | 1.996.153 |

=== Pneumatic network blockade of 1949 ===
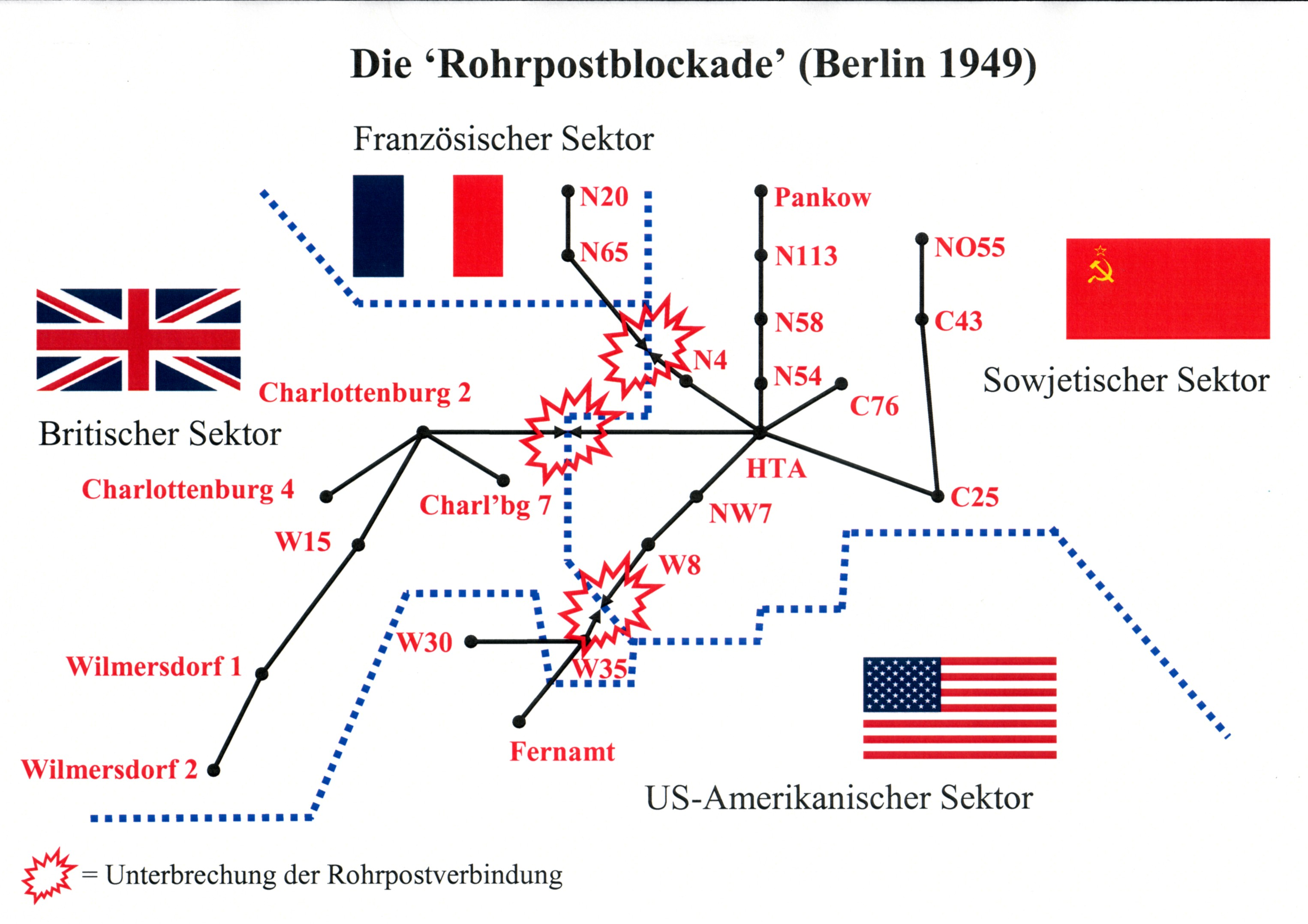
Scheme of the pneumatic post network interrupted by the pneumatic post blockade in 1949

The reconstruction of the pneumatic postal network was seriously hampered by the increasingly strained East-West conflict (20th June 1948: currency reform in the western zones, 23rd June currency reform in the Soviet zone), the western sectors of Berlin were removed from their administrative context by linking the currency to the western zones: On June 22, 1948, the Soviet side voted against the proposal, which had emerged in four-power talks, to introduce a jointly controlled currency in the divided city. On behalf of the Soviet Military Administration in Germany (SMAD), Marshal Vasily Danilovich Sokolovsky ordered the Lord Mayor of Berlin in Order No. 111 to carry out the currency reform planned for June 23, 1948, in the Soviet Occupation Zone (SBZ) in all four Berlin sectors. The Western city commanders immediately declared this order invalid on their city territory. On June 24, the DM was then handed out in the three western sectors, marked with a "B" stamp to distinguish it as currency issued in the city. This was answered by the USSR by blocking access to the western sectors (Berlin Blockade).

In January 1949, the Soviet side cut off the pneumatic post connections between the Soviet sector and the western sectors of Berlin at the sector borders (so-called pneumatic post blockade), thus aggravating the postal situation. As the Berlin pneumatic delivery network had historically been developed from the Haupttelegrafenamt Berlin, thus the centre of the entire network was now located in the Soviet sector.

Starting from the resulting location, the pneumatic post network in Berlin was divided and developed as two independently functioning pneumatic post networks until it ceased operation (1963 in West Berlin, 1977 in East Berlin). Whether there were still connections between the East and West Berlin networks maintained by Allied order is still officially unknown. There are, however, telegrams between East and West Berlin from the 1950s which, as the corresponding telegram forms printed in the eastern section prove, were quite obviously received and made out in the main telegraph office and then also received delivery in the western sectors with pneumatic post stamps.

=== Express mail service Berlin 1949 to 1955 ===
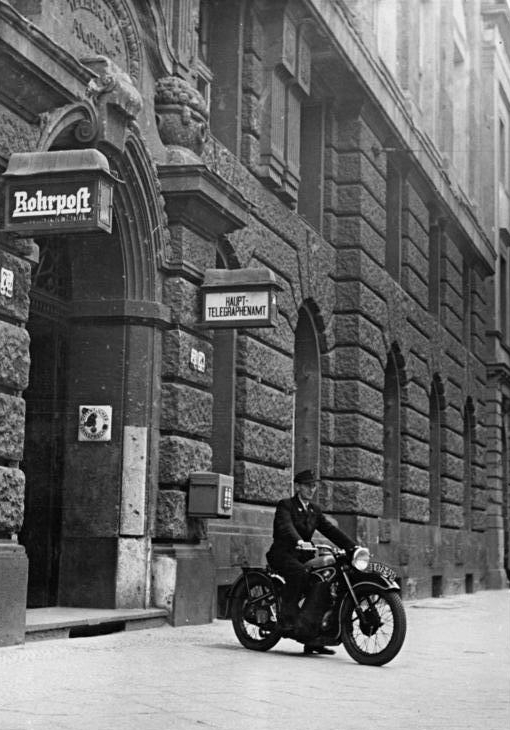
Postman on BMW motorcycle in front of the Haupttelegrafenamt on Oranienburger Straße. Sign "Rohrpost" next to entrance (1950)

While the East Berlin pneumatic post network remained functional due to the central position of the Main Telegraph Office, the now newly established West Berlin postal administration conceived a new system of express mail. This replacement system, which was introduced on 1 March 1949, combined the remaining pneumatic tube lines with the possibility of transporting the fast mail by car, motorbike, tram, bicycle and boat. In this way, the now missing connections were bridged and West Berlin was provided with a highly efficient express mail system throughout the city: the Postschnelldienst Berlin. This was later renamed to the extent that the pneumatic post gained importance within the system and even new routes were built to Rohrpost-Schnelldienst.

The charges for simple shipments within the express postal service were initially 1 DM-East from March 1, 1949, to March 31, 1949. Of course, one was allowed to pay in DM-West, but hardly anyone did. Therefore, postage on items sent by the express postal service in March 1949 with red-overprint stamps of Berlin or with stamps of the series Bauten I are rare. As of April 1, 1949, the West Berlin Post Office recognised DM-West as the only valid means of payment for its services, which meant that only 1 DM-West was now payable. Later, the fee was reduced to 80 Pfennig. If the postage for the express postal service was a uniform postage which was not composed of individual services, with the abolition of the express postal service a compound postage was charged again if one wanted to use the combination of pneumatic tube mail and express delivery as in the days of the express postal service. Thus, the pneumatic tube delivery cost 20 Pfennig and the express delivery fee 60 Pfennig. The fees for a local postcard of 8 Pfennig or for a local letter of the first weight level of 10 Pfennig were added. Thus the abolition of the express mail service was tantamount to a postage increase.

=== End of the pneumatic post in West Berlin 1963 ===
On 28 February 1963, the pneumatic post service for public transport was discontinued as a result of the ever-improving equipment of the western part of the city with telephones and telex machines. At the same time, in other cities such as Rohrpost in Hamburg, it was discovered that, in view of the increasing road traffic, the volumes of mail could no longer be handled above ground if they were to be fast, and new pneumatic post facilities were therefore required.

For internal purposes, the pneumatic post in West Berlin was still used for a while despite being closed to the public. In 1972 the operation of the pneumatic post Berlin West was finally stopped.

== See also ==
- London Pneumatic Despatch Company
