= Pneumatic tube =

Compressed air or vacuum transport system

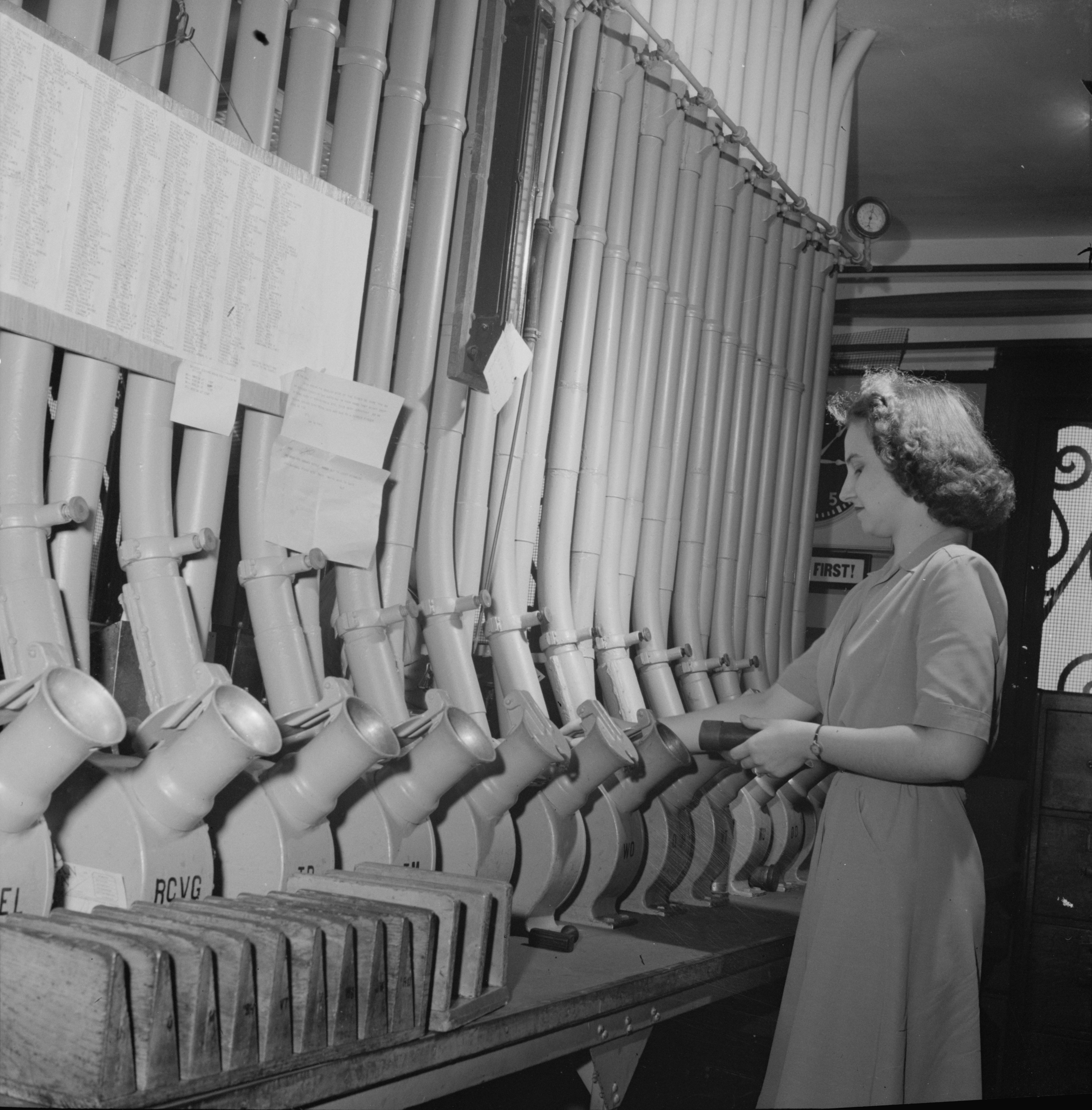
A pneumatic tube system in Washington, D.C., in 1943

Pneumatic tubes (or capsule pipelines, also known as pneumatic tube transport or PTT or PTS or pneumatic tube systems ) are systems that propel cylindrical containers/carriers through networks of tubes by compressed air or by partial vacuum. They are used for transporting solid objects, as opposed to conventional pipelines which transport fluids. In the late 19th and early 20th centuries pneumatic tube networks were most often found in offices that needed to transport small, urgent packages such as mail, other paperwork, or money over relatively short distances; with most systems confined to a single building or at most an area within a city. The largest installations became quite complex in their time, but have mostly been superseded by digitisation in the information age. Some systems have been further developed in the 21st century in places such as hospitals, to send blood samples and similar time-sensitive packages to clinical laboratories for analysis.

A small number of pneumatic transportation systems were built for larger cargo, to compete with train and subway systems. However these systems never gained popularity.

== History ==
=== Historical use ===
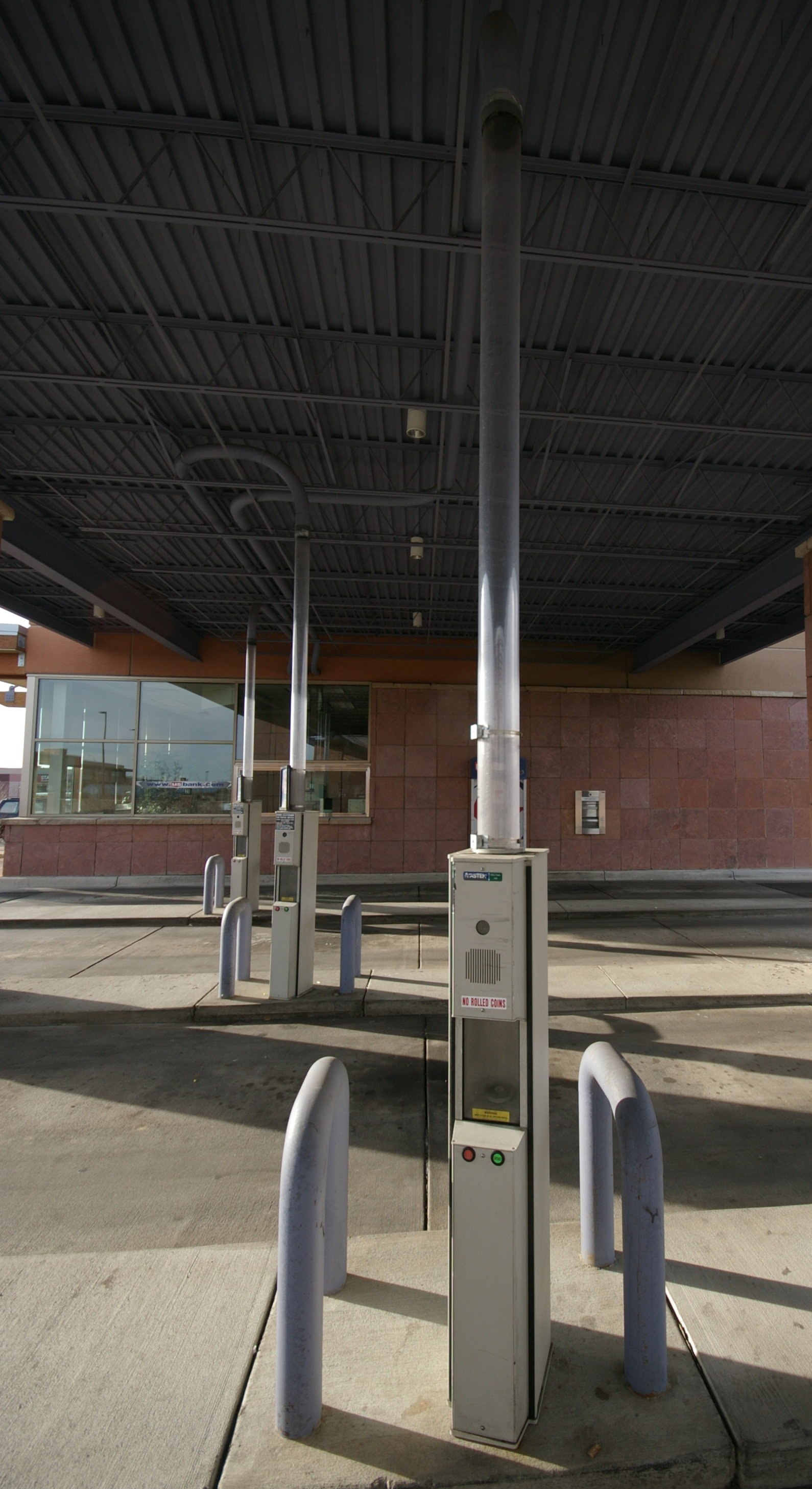
Pneumatic tubes at a drive-through bank

Pneumatic transportation was invented by William Murdoch around 1799. Capsule pipelines were first used in the Victorian era, to transmit telegrams from telegraph stations to nearby buildings. The system is known as pneumatic dispatch.

In 1854, Josiah Latimer Clark was issued a patent "for conveying letters or parcels between places by the pressure of air and vacuum". In 1853, he installed a 220-yard (200 m) pneumatic system between the London Stock Exchange in Threadneedle Street, London, and the offices of the Electric Telegraph Company in Lothbury. The Electric Telegraph Company used the system to acquire stock prices and other financial information to pass to subscribers of their service over their telegraph wires. This enabled much more rapid dissemination of information, as without the pneumatic system the company would have had to employ runners to carry messages between the two buildings, or else employ trained telegraph operators within the Stock Exchange. In the mid-1860s the company installed similar systems to local stock exchanges in Liverpool, Birmingham, and Manchester. After the telegraphs were nationalised in Britain the pneumatic system continued to be expanded under Post Office Telegraphs. That expansion was primarily driven by Joseph William Willmot (previously employed at the Electric & International Telegraph Company) improving Latimer-Clark's invention in 1870 with the "double sluice pneumatic valve", and in 1880 with the "intermediate signaller/quick break switch for pneumatic tubes", which dramatically sped up operations and made it possible for a number of carrier messages to be in the tube at any one time. By 1880 there were over 21 miles (34 km) of tube in London. A tube was laid between the Aberdeen fish market office and the main post office to facilitate the rapid sale of the very perishable commodity.

While they are commonly used for small parcels and documents, including cash carriers at banks or supermarkets, in the early 19th century they were proposed for transport of heavy freight. It was once envisaged that networks of massive tubes might be used to transport people.

=== Pneumatic tube systems in hospitals ===
Hospitals deploy PTS as part of broader automation strategies to handle rising patient volumes and throughput pressures in many settings, particularly those with aging populations and high admission rates. International indicators show heterogeneous trends—discharges fell in many OECD countries between 2011 and 2019, but rose substantially in others (e.g., Korea and Japan), and increased in large partner countries such as China—illustrating why capacity solutions like PTS are adopted to alleviate internal logistics bottlenecks.

==== History and adoption ====
Hospitals have deployed PTS for decades, with contemporary systems shifting from single-zone layouts to multi-zone architectures that connect high-traffic clinical areas. Vendors emphasize interdepartmental connectivity (e.g., pharmacy–lab–ward links) and auditability as part of hospital logistics.

==== Applications ====
===== Laboratory specimen transport =====
PTS are widely used for routine and urgent specimen transport from wards and emergency departments to central laboratories. Studies show that, when validated, PTS can achieve fast transit times without degrading analytical quality; however, laboratories typically perform local validation because effects can vary by analyte and system design.

===== Pharmacy logistics and Unit Dose =====
Hospital pharmacies use PTS to expedite medication distribution to wards and automated dispensing points. Integration with Unit Dose packaging and dispensing solutions enables patient-specific, traceable medication flows and supports closed-loop medication management. Industry systems (e.g., TheraPick; Baxter’s unit-dose platforms) and hospital PTS vendors describe end-to-end traceability and secure handover at sending/receiving stations.

===== Automated handover to laboratories and pharmacies =====
Some PTS installations provide automated interfaces to pre-analytical laboratory lines, allowing carriers to be received, identified, and unloaded robotically so that standard tests enter fully automated tracks with minimal manual handling. Pharmacies likewise integrate stations that enforce controlled access and electronic logging at dispatch and receipt.

=== Further uses and logistics integration ===
In the United States, drive-up banks often used pneumatic tubes to transport cash and documents between cars and tellers; by the 2020s some of these have been removed, obviated by the rise of mobile banking apps and the increasing sophistication of ATMs. Many hospitals have a computer-controlled pneumatic tube system to deliver drugs, documents, and specimens to and from laboratories and nurses' stations. Many factories use them to deliver parts quickly across large campuses. Many larger stores use systems to securely transport excess cash from checkout stands to back offices, and to send change back to cashiers. They are used in casinos to move money, chips, and cards quickly and securely. Japanese love hotels use them to allow customers to settle bills anonymously. NASA's original Mission Control Center had pneumatic tubes connecting controller consoles with staff support rooms. Mission Operations Control Room 2 was last used in its original configuration in 1992 and then remodeled for other missions. Because the room was designated a National Historic Landmark in 1985, it was decided in 2017 to restore it to its 1960s condition. The pneumatic tubes were removed and sent to the Cosmosphere in Kansas for restoration.

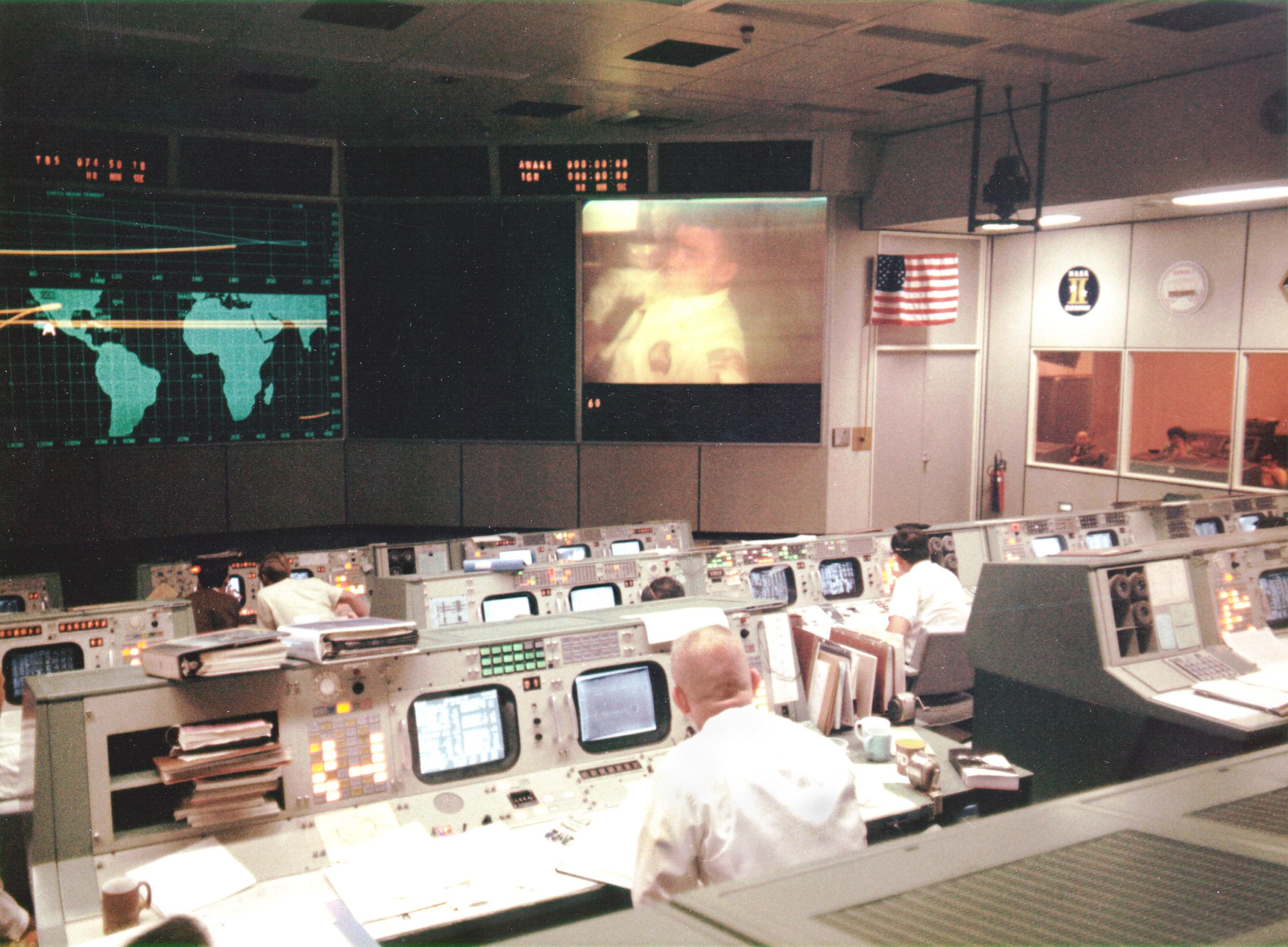
NASA Mission Control Center during the Apollo 13 mission, with pneumatic tube canisters in console to the right

Pneumatic tube systems have been used in nuclear chemistry to transport samples during neutron activation analysis. Samples must be moved from the nuclear reactor core, in which they are bombarded with neutrons, to the instrument that measures the resulting radiation. As some of the radioactive isotopes in the sample can have very short half-lives, speed is important. These systems may be automated, with a magazine of sample tubes that are moved into the reactor core in turn for a predetermined time, before being moved to the instrument station and finally to a container for storage and disposal.

Until it closed in early 2011, a McDonald's in Edina, Minnesota claimed to be the "World's Only Pneumatic Air Drive-Thru," sending food from their strip-mall location to a drive-through in the middle of a parking lot.

Technology editor Quentin Hardy noted renewed interest as of 2015 in transmission of data by pneumatic tube accompanied discussions of digital network security, and he cited research into London's forgotten pneumatic network.

Translogic is one of the largest modern healthcare pneumatic tube providers. KUKA is a German manufacturer of industrial robots and factory automation systems. In 2016, the company was acquired by the Chinese appliance manufacturer Midea Group. KUKA acquired Swisslog in 2014 and Translogic in 1999.

Related applications include fish cannons which use mechanisms very similar to pneumatic tube systems.

== Applications ==
=== In postal service ===
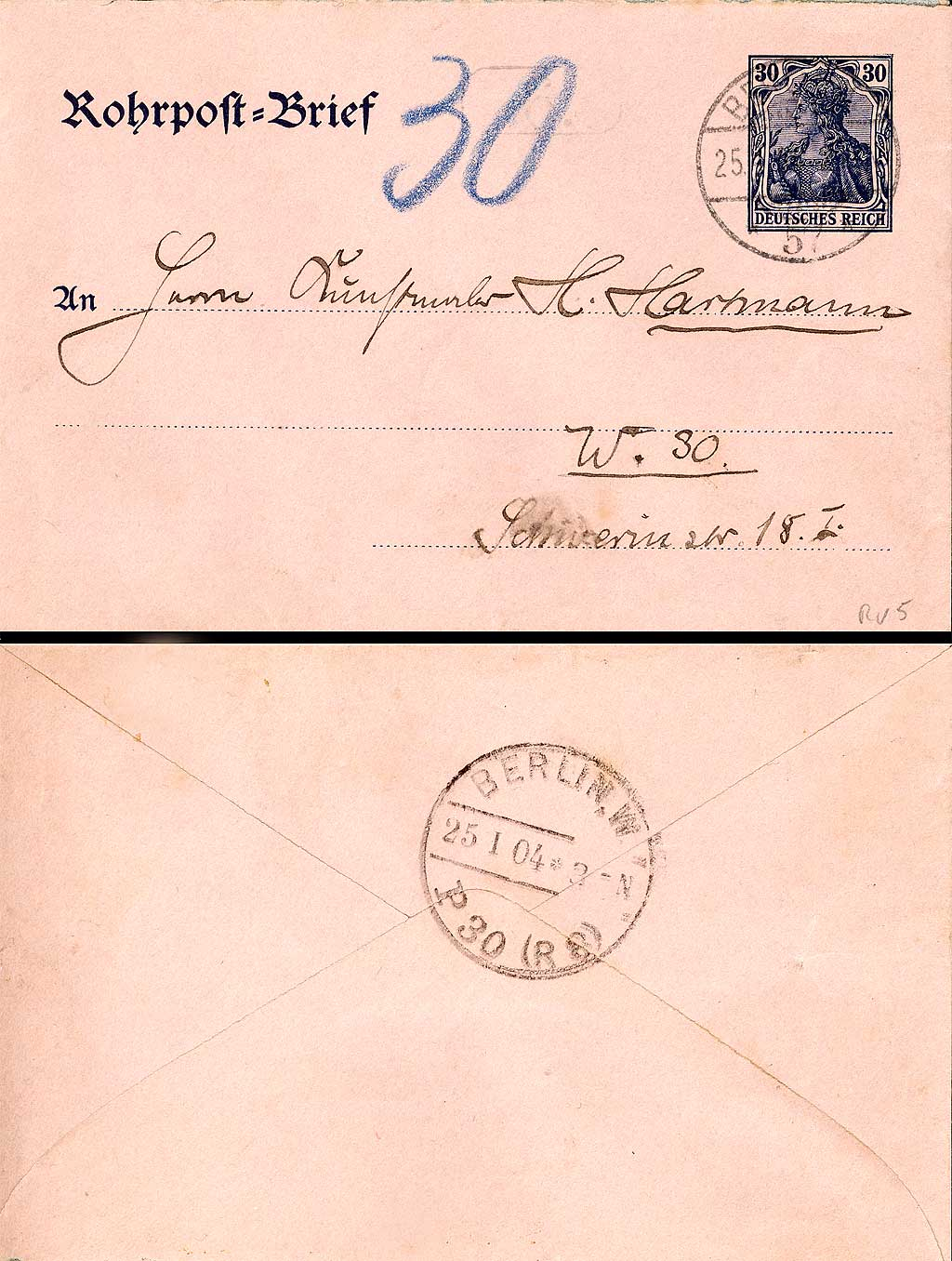
Pneumatic tube letter (Rohrpost-Brief) from Berlin, Germany, 1904

Pneumatic post or pneumatic mail is a system to deliver letters through pressurized air tubes. It was invented by the Scottish engineer William Murdoch in the 19th century and was later developed by the London Pneumatic Despatch Company. Pneumatic post systems were used in several large cities starting in the second half of the 19th century (including an 1866 London system powerful and large enough to transport humans during trial runs – though not intended for that purpose), but later were largely abandoned.

A major network of tubes in Paris (the Paris pneumatic post) was in use until 1984, when it was abandoned in favor of computers and fax machines. The Prague pneumatic post commenced for the public in 1889 in Prague, now in the Czech Republic, and the network extended approximately 60 kilometres (37 mi).

Pneumatic post stations usually connect post offices, stock exchanges, banks and ministries. Italy was the only country to issue postage stamps (between 1913 and 1966) specifically for pneumatic post. Austria, France, and Germany issued postal stationery for pneumatic use.

Typical applications are in banks, hospitals, and supermarkets. Many large retailers used pneumatic tubes to transport cheques or other documents from cashiers to the accounting office.

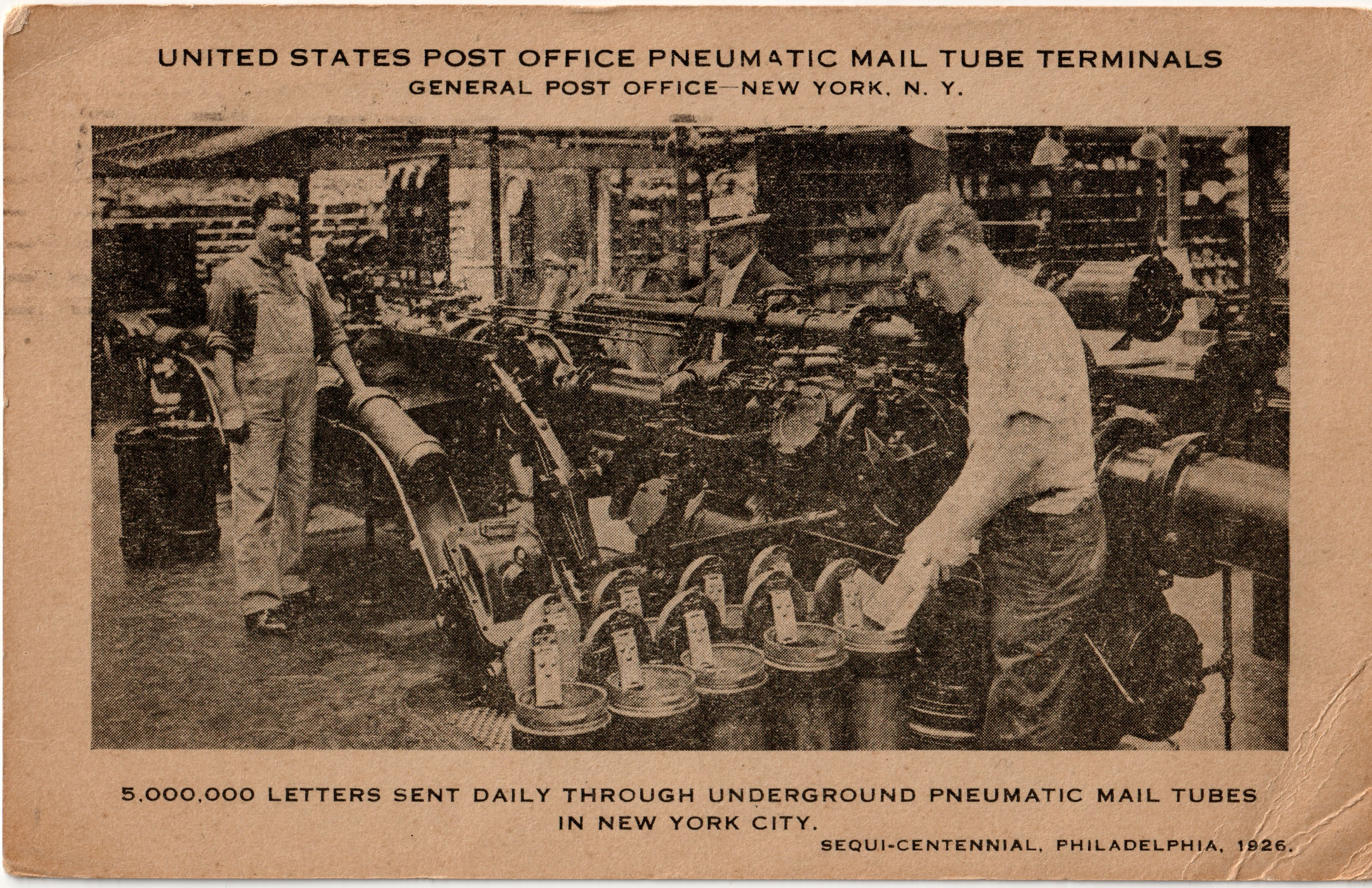
United States Post Office pneumatic mail tubes in operation in New York City

Historical use

- 1853: linking the London Stock Exchange to the city's main telegraph station (a distance of 220 yards (200 m) )
- 1861: in London with the London Pneumatic Despatch Company providing services from Euston railway station to the General Post Office and Holborn
- 1864: in Liverpool connecting the Electric and International Telegraph Company telegraph stations in Castle Street, Water Street, and the Exchange Buildings
- 1864: in Manchester to connect the Electric and International Telegraph Company central offices at York Street, with branch offices at Dulcie Buildings and Mosley Street
- 1865: in Birmingham, installed by the Electric and International Telegraph Company between the New Exchange Buildings in Stephenson Place and their branch office in Temple Buildings, New Street.
- 1865: in Berlin (until 1976), the Rohrpost, a system 400 kilometers in total length at its peak in 1940
- 1866: in Paris (until 1984, 467 kilometers in total length from 1934). John Steinbeck mentioned this system in The Short Reign of Pippin IV: A Fabrication: "You pay no attention to the pneumatique."
- 1871: in Dublin
- 1875: in Vienna (until 1956) - including the unrealised corpse network of Zentralfriedhof
- 1887: in Prague (until 2002 due to flooding), the Prague pneumatic post
- 1893: the first North American system was established in Philadelphia by Postmaster General John Wanamaker, who had previously employed the technology at his department store. The system, which initially connected the downtown post offices, was later extended to the principal railroad stations, the stock exchanges, and many private businesses. It was operated by the United States Post Office Department which later opened similar systems in cities such as New York (connecting Brooklyn and Manhattan), Chicago, Boston, and St. Louis. The last of these closed in 1953.
- Other cities: Munich, Rio de Janeiro, Buenos Aires, Hamburg, Rome, Naples, Milan, Marseille, Melbourne, Tokyo, Osaka, Nagoya, Kobe, Zurich, Lausanne, Geneva, Bern, Basel

- 1950s-1989: CIA headquarters (now known as the Old Headquarters Building)

=== In public transportation ===
19th century

In 1812, George Medhurst first proposed, but never implemented, blowing passenger carriages through a tunnel. Precursors of pneumatic tube systems for passenger transport, the atmospheric railway (for which the tube was laid between the rails, with a piston running in it suspended from the train through a sealable slot in the top of the tube) were operated as follows:

- 1844–54: Dublin and Kingstown Railway's Dalkey Atmospheric Railway between Kingstown (Dún Laoghaire) and Dalkey, Ireland (1.75 mi [2.82 km])
- 1846–47: London and Croydon Railway between Croydon and New Cross, London, England (7.5 mi [12.1 km])
- 1847–48: Isambard Kingdom Brunel's South Devon Railway between Exeter and Newton Abbot, England (20 mi [32 km])
- 1847–60: Paris–Saint-Germain railway between Bois de Vésinet and Saint-Germain-en-Laye, France (2 km [1.2 mi])

In 1861, the London Pneumatic Despatch Company built a system large enough to move a person, although it was intended for parcels. The inauguration of the new Holborn Station on 10 October 1865 was marked by having the Duke of Buckingham, the chairman, and some company directors blown through the tube to Euston (a five-minute trip).

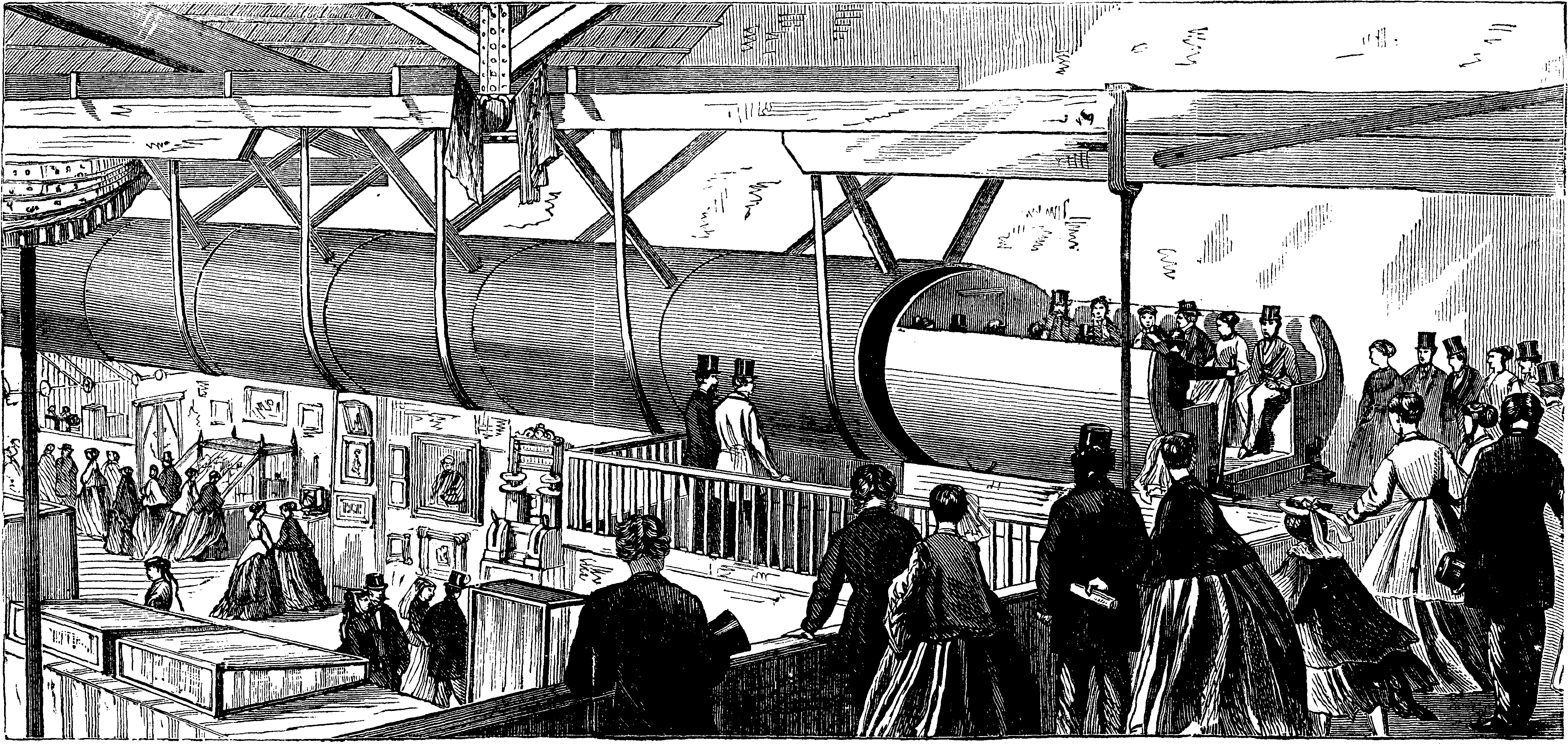
Alfred Ely Beach's experimental pneumatic elevated subway on display in 1867

The 550-metre (1,804 ft) Crystal Palace pneumatic railway was exhibited at the Crystal Palace in 1864. This was a prototype for a proposed Waterloo and Whitehall Railway that would have run under the River Thames linking Waterloo and Charing Cross. Digging commenced in 1865 but was halted in 1868 due to financial problems.

In 1867 at the American Institute Fair in New York, Alfred Ely Beach demonstrated a 100-foot (30 m) long, 6-foot (1.8 m) diameter pipe that was capable of moving 12 passengers plus a conductor. One year after New York City's first-ever elevated rail line went into service; in 1869, the Beach Pneumatic Transit Company of New York secretly constructed a 312-foot (95 m) long, 8.9-foot (2.7 m) diameter pneumatic subway line under Broadway, to demonstrate the possibilities of the new transport mode. The line only operated for a few months, closing after Beach was unsuccessful in getting permission to extend it – Boss Tweed, a corrupt influential politician, did not want it to go ahead as he was intending to personally invest into competing schemes for an elevated rail line.

20th century

In the 1920s, the Canadian Pacific and Canadian National Railways cooperated together to lay an elaborate system of 4,500 metre pneumatic tubing between four of their offices to Postal Station A at Union Station in Toronto, Canada. There was also a connection to the mail room at the Royal York Hotel. The newspapers the Star and Telegram joined into the system, laying pipes. In the 1960s, Lockheed and MIT with the United States Department of Commerce conducted feasibility studies on a vactrain system powered by ambient atmospheric pressure and "gravitational pendulum assist" to connect cities on the country's East Coast. They calculated that the run between Philadelphia and New York City would average 174 meters per second, that is 626 km/h (388 mph). When those plans were abandoned as too expensive, Lockheed engineer L.K. Edwards founded Tube Transit, Inc. to develop technology based on "gravity-vacuum transportation". In 1967 he proposed a Bay Area Gravity-Vacuum Transit for California that would run alongside the then-under construction BART system. It was never built.

21st century

Research into trains running in partially evacuated tubes, such as the Vactrain and Hyperloop, is continuing.

=== Pneumatic elevator ===
A pneumatic elevator consists of a cylindrical vertical shaft (typically made of transparent plastic), and a passenger capsule (also transparent) within the shaft which moves vertically by means of differential air pressure above and below. The main advantage that it requires neither a pit below or a loft above the shaft.

For ascending operations, a vacuum pump at the top of the elevator shaft creates a low pressure by drawing air from above the capsule while below the greater normal atmospheric pressure is permitted to enter at the lower (ground floor) level below the capsule providing lift.

To descend, electronically controlled valves inside the tubular shaft regulate the entry and exit of air within the cylinder lowering the car smoothly by means of programmed operation. In the event of a failure of the vacuum pump or electronically controlled valves, the trapped volume of air below the capsule acts as a cushion that is allowed to slowly escape by means of a mechanical valve, gently returning the capsule to the lowest level.

=== In money transfer ===
In large retail stores, pneumatic tube systems were used to transport sales slips and money from the salesperson to a centralized tube room, where cashiers could make change, reference credit records, and so on.

Many banks with drive-throughs also use pneumatic tubes.

=== In medicine ===
Many hospitals have pneumatic tube systems which send samples to laboratories. Blood preservations are transported, where weight and transport duration matter as well as preventing haemolysis caused by centrifugal and accelerating forces. Pneumatic tube systems are also used in hospitals to transport X-rays, patient documents, general documents, drugs and test results.

6-inch (152 mm) pneumatic tube systems have been shown to handle heavy liter-capacity IV bags with significantly fewer jams compared to the 4-inch (102 mm) systems.

=== Department stores ===
To manage its mail order business the department store Sears built "massive warehouses, like its central facility in Chicago, in which messages to various departments and assembly workers were sent through pneumatic tubes". Many other department stores had pneumatic tube systems in the 20th century, such as Jacksons of Reading and Myer in Melbourne, Australia. The National Library of Australia's building (opened 1968), incorporates a pneumatic tube system for sending book requests from the reading rooms to the book stacks. The system is no longer used, but remains partially operational, and is demonstrated on behind the scenes tours.

=== Waste disposal ===
The use of pneumatic tubes in waste disposal units include the Masjid al-Haram, Mecca, GlashusEtt in the Hammarby Sjöstad area of Stockholm (Sweden), Old Montreal (Canada), Disney World (US) and Roosevelt Island and Hudson Yards (US).

=== In production ===
Pneumatic tube systems are used in production plants. Uses include conveying spare parts, measuring instruments, tools, or work pieces alongside conveyor belts or in the production process. In industrial laboratories samples are transported through the pneumatic tube systems. These can be conveyed in any physical state (solid, liquid, gas) and at any temperature. For example, the industrial company ThyssenKrupp sends 900 °C (1,650 °F) steel samples through pneumatic tubes at a rate of 22 m (72 ft) per second from the furnace to the laboratory.

== Technical characteristics ==
Modern systems (for smaller, i.e. “normal”, tube diameters as used in the transport of small capsules) reach speeds of around 7.5 m (25 ft) per second, though some historical systems already achieved speeds of 10 m (33 ft) per second. At the same time, varying air pressures allow capsules to brake slowly, removing the jarring arrival that used to characterise earlier systems and make them unsuitable for fragile contents.

Very powerful systems can transport items with a weight of up to 50 kg (110 lb) and a diameter of up to 500 mm (20 in). More than 100 lines and 1000 stations can be connected.

Further, modern systems can be computer-controlled for tracking of any specific capsule and managing priority deliveries as well as system efficiency. With this technology, time-critical items can be transported, such as tissue samples taken during a surgery in a hospital. RFID chips within the capsules gather data – e. g. about the location of the carrier, its transport speed or its destination. The systems collect and save these data to help users optimize their internal processes and turnaround times. The facilities can be linked to the company's software systems, e.g. laboratory information systems, for full integration into company logistical management and production chains.

== See also ==
- Automated vacuum collection
- C1 Espresso
- Lamson Engineering Company Ltd
- Pipeline transport
- Prague pneumatic post, the world's last preserved pneumatic mail system
- Vactrain
