= C1 Espresso =

Café in Christchurch, New Zealand

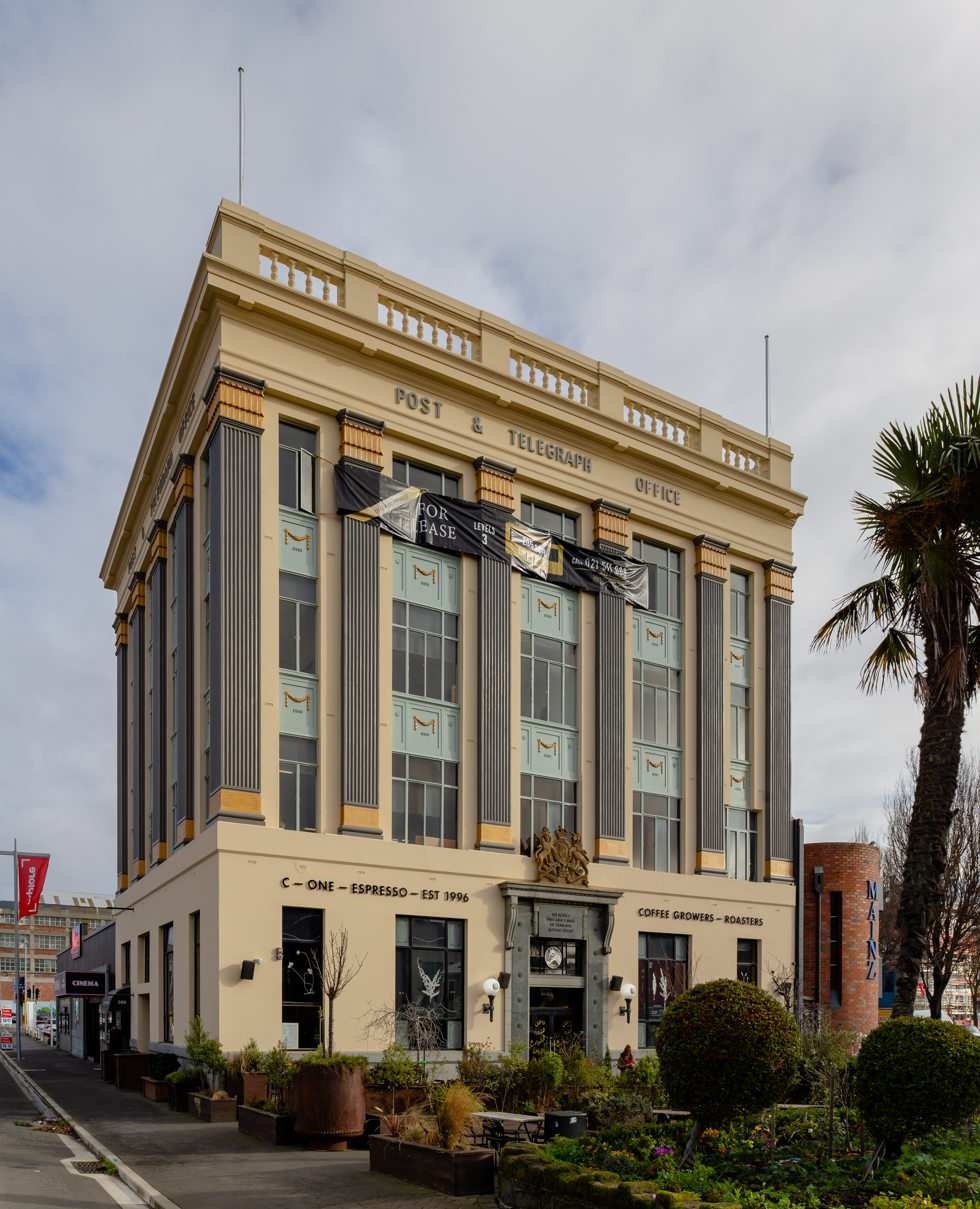
- C1 Espresso is on the ground floor of the former High Street Post Office.
- Interactive map of C1 Espresso

Restaurant information
- Established: 1996
- Location: Christchurch, New Zealand
- Coordinates: 43.5351°S 172.6405°E
- Seating capacity: 350
- Website: c1espresso.co.nz

C1 Espresso is a café in Christchurch, New Zealand. It uses pneumatic tubes placed under the ceiling to transport food to the customers' tables at 140 kilometres per hour (87 mph). The tubes are also used to transport customer dockets to the kitchen.

== History ==
C1 Espresso was opened in 1996 in Christchurch by Sam and Fleur Crofskey.

The 2011 Christchurch earthquake on 22 February forced C1 Espresso to close. The eatery later moved across the road, to the former High Street Post Office and was officially reopened on 9 November 2012 by Canterbury Earthquake Recovery Minister Gerry Brownlee, making it one of the first central city businesses to open after the earthquakes.

After seeing pneumatic tubes in an episode of the cartoon Futurama, Crofskey decided to use them in the café, and they started using them to transport dockets to the kitchen. After Crofskey felt that this was not enough, the eatery started placing pneumatic tubes around the ceiling to deliver food to tables in 2013 and 2014.

In 2019 C1 Espresso was inducted into the Restaurant Association's Hall of Fame.

In November 2020 former employees accused Crofskey of bullying, not allowing and discouraging breaks and sick days, and asking inappropriate questions. Crofskey denied these claims. The employees and a petition of 1500 signatures called for the eatery to be removed from the Hall of Fame, and the Restaurant Association started investigating the case. A Facebook group named "C1 Boycott and Protest Group" was created by a former employee, and gathered over 4,000 members. Crofskey later temporarily stepped down for a "long break", "to reflect on the conversations of the past week". All of C1 Espresso's social media pages were soon deleted.

In January 2021 employee Dale Palea'ae and her fiancé Nick Annear bought C1 Espresso from Crofskey.

== Operations ==
As of 2018 C1 Espresso displays some of its worst Tripadvisor reviews on its menu. Under the eatery's logo on receipts reads the motto "The home of terrible Trip Advisor reviews". Crofskey said that this is a way to counter unfair and anonymous negative reviews about the café, but said that it was likely to increase negative Tripadvisor reviews by people to wanting to get featured on the menu.

== Gallery ==
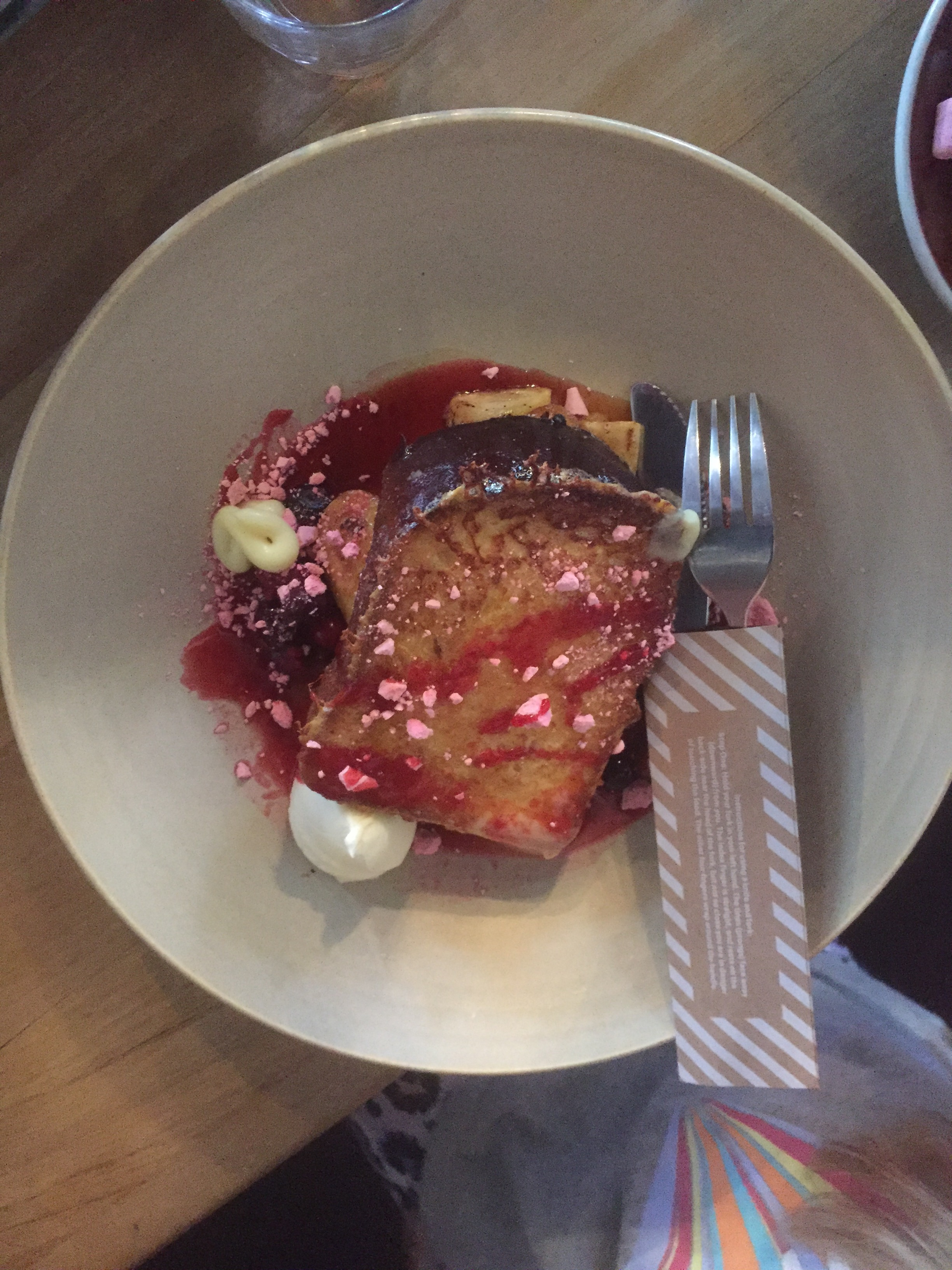
French toast (2020)

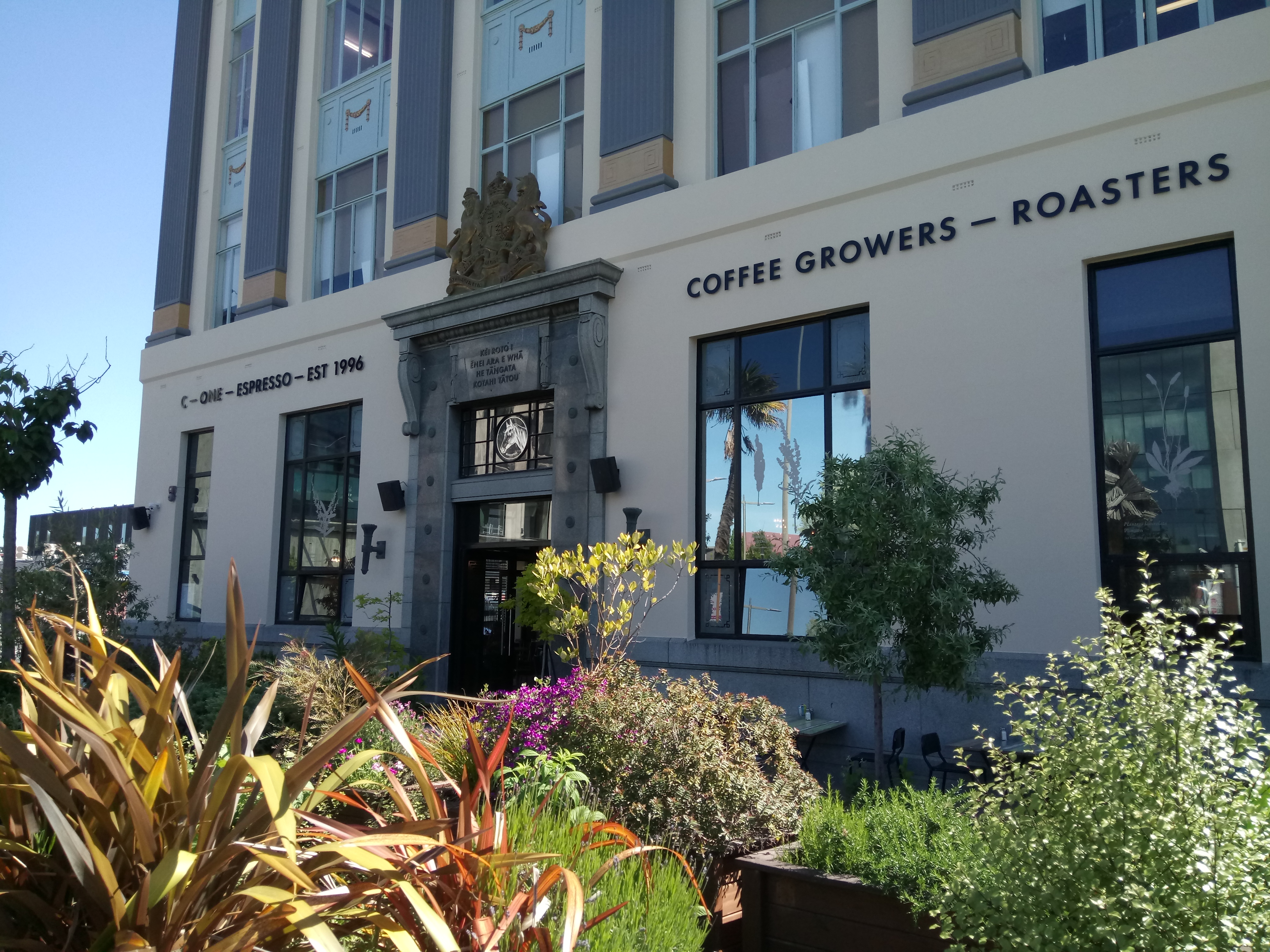
C1 main entrance

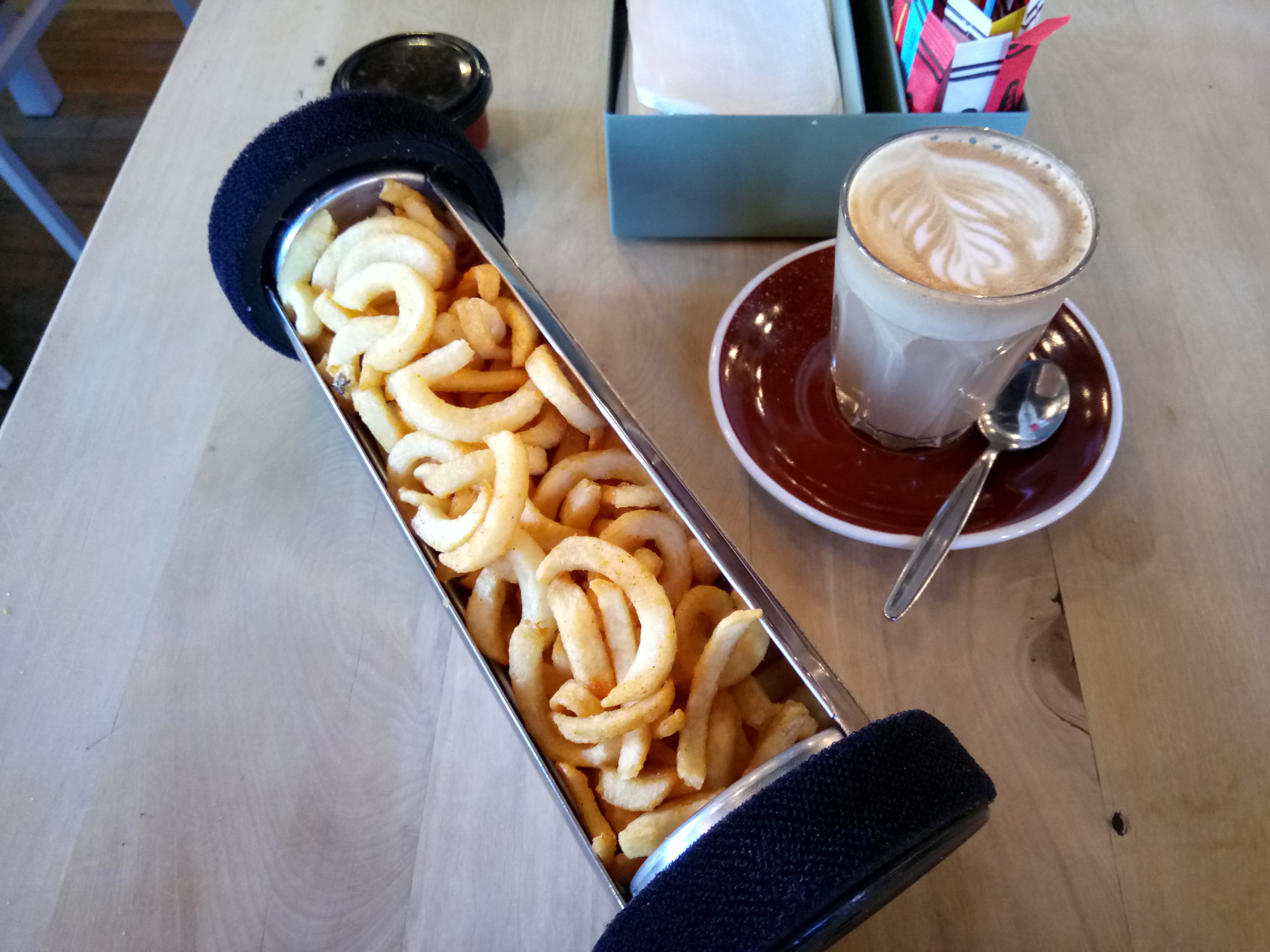
Chips delivered through a pneumatic tube
