= Waddle fan =

Large centrifugal fans, used to ventilate coal mines

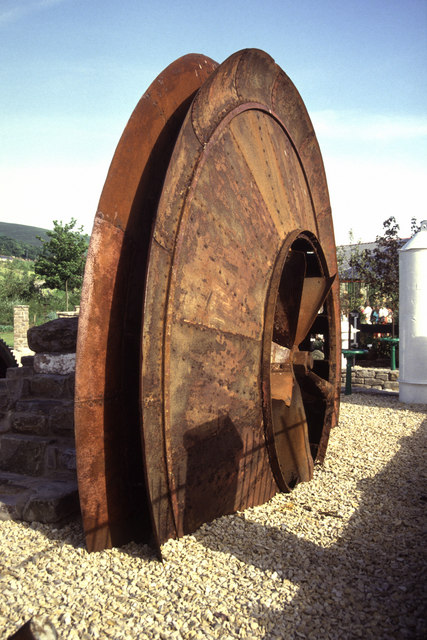
Removed fan, on display at the Ebbw Vale Garden Festival. Note the évasée rim.

Waddle fans, sometimes incorrectly spelled Waddell, were large centrifugal fans, used to ventilate coal mines.

They were noteworthy for their extremely large size and distinguished by an integral shroud for the fan, which makes it possible to mount them in the open air.

== Waddle Engineering and Fan Company ==
They were built by the Waddle Engineering and Fan Company Limited, in Llanelli, Carmarthenshire. Their archives are now held by Carmarthenshire Archives and the Richard Burton Archives at Swansea University.

The fans were most common in their local area of South Wales, but they were also widely used in other mining areas in England. Waddle Engineering were in business from 1830 to 1970. Their distinctive fan always worked at relatively slow speed and so was most suitable for steam engine drive. As high speed fans driven by electric motors became more common, Waddle failed to make this transition.

== Operation ==
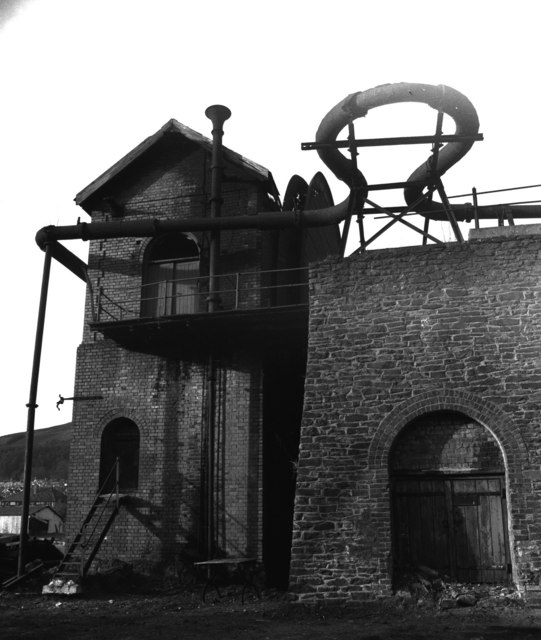
40' fan at Nixon's Navigation Colliery

Air entered the fan through the central eye and exited through the rim. These fans were thus all suction devices, extracting air from a mine and releasing it to the atmosphere. A typical installation comprised a pit head building, usually built of stone at this period, with a fan engine house alongside it. The fan was mounted high in the gap between the buildings, with a connection into the pithead through a circular window in the building and into the eye of the fan. (Note: These distinctive circular windows may still be recognised in surviving old pithead buildings.) The pithead was made airtight against its reduced internal pressure by shuttered windows and close-fitting doors. If the same building was also used for winding – the lowering and raising of men and equipment – the winding gear could be mounted in the clear space above the shaft, without interfering with the fan arrangements. Mine cages and trams passed through the usual self-closing air doors.

The Waddle design's distinctive feature was its self-shrouded or 'caseless' design, where the rotating fan formed its own enclosure. Although small fans of this form are common today, Waddle were the only company to make them of this size, or for mine ventilation.

After the Hartley Colliery Disaster in 1862, mine owners were compelled to improve mine ventilation. Ventilation was now required to include separate shafts for down-cast and up-cast airflow, and for ventilation to be provided by fans rather than the older furnace system. (Note: Effectively a thermosyphon system.) This encouraged sales of ventilation fans, particularly the Waddle. As the fan impeller formed its own shroud, it required little additional installation and so was relatively easy to retro-fit to an existing pithead.

These fans moved at relatively low speeds, usually being driven by rope drives from a horizontal steam engine on the ground floor below the fan. They always had one single impeller and so to achieve the large air volumes required, they were of large diameter. Although made in a range of sizes, a common large-size fan was 40 ft in diameter. Using a single impeller was common for large ventilation fans, although some makers used a double-sided impeller to give twice the airflow for a similar rotating mass. Waddle, though, always used a single-sided impeller with an overhung bearing at the rear face of the fan. This avoided having the bearings placed in the often damp airstream, simplifying maintenance.

The first fans were of simple design. An 1890 fan at Morton Colliery, Derbyshire, had a shallow conical impeller of 40 ft diameter and 1 ft 6in width at the rim. The internal blades were of extremely curved form. Its construction is simple, of flat wrought iron plates, joined by rivets and angle iron. Working at 45 rpm, the fan moved 70,000 cubic feet of air per minute. Within a few years, the aerodynamics of the impeller had developed so that its operating speed and efficiency had increased substantially. An 1896 fan at Chanters Colliery, Tyldesley, Lancashire, was of the same overall dimensions and speed, but moved 150,000 cu ft / minute. The improvements of these later fans were the use of an outwardly flanged, curved évasée rim that gave smoother airflow at the rim and also straighter internal blades, for the higher speed fans.

Later fans, after World War I, began to be driven by electric motors instead. These ran at higher speeds and so the large diameter fan was unsuitable, as its high linear air velocity at the rim led to turbulence and mechanical vibration. These fans began to be used as pairs of smaller fans (typically 17 ft) instead, although the Waddle design was basically unsuitable here, leading to its eventual demise.

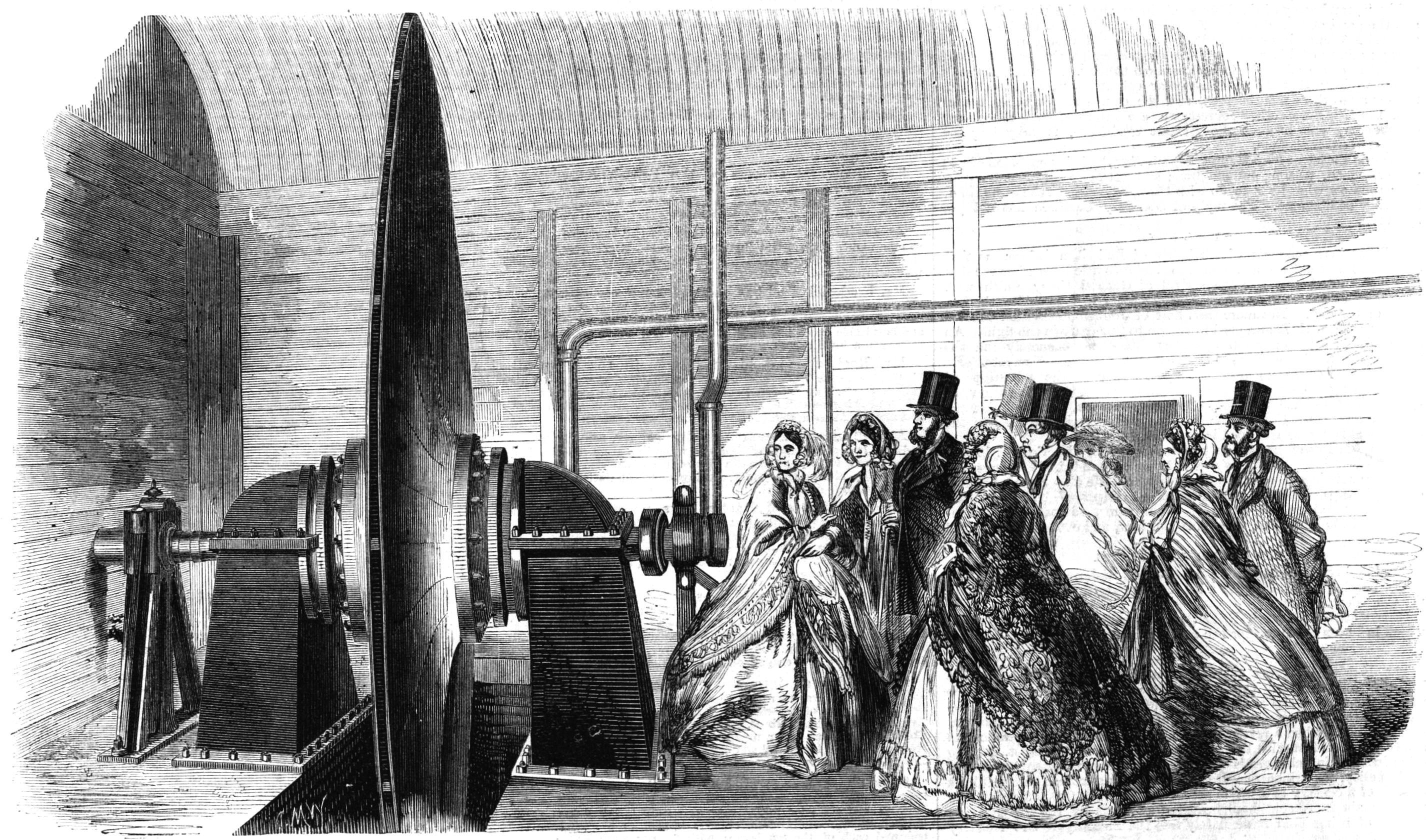
The fan disc of the Battersea railway in 1861

In 1861 a Waddle fan was used to power the miniature atmospheric railway built at Battersea as a prototype for the underground railway between London post offices. This was an unusual example of a double-sided Waddle fan, built to provide a higher draft pressure difference.
