= Thomas Webster Rammell =

British engineer

Thomas Webster Rammell was born in 1814 on the Isle of Thanet, Kent, United Kingdom. He became an engineer, working for the Metropolitan Board of Works. He was a close friend of Henry Austin, son-in-law of Charles Dickens.

In 1849 he visited the North Devon town of Barnstaple to open an inquiry into the "sewage, drainage and supply of water and the sanitary conditions of the inhabitants". He also opened a similar enquiry in June 1849 at High Wycombe, in Buckinghamshire, the outcome of which was published in July 1850.

He died in 1879 as a result of developing diabetes. Shortly before his death his wife wrote to Richard Temple-Grenville, 3rd Duke of Buckingham and Chandos, an old friend, asking whether he had any knowledge of insulin which had recently been developed. Rammell is buried in an unmarked grave in Watford. Contrary to popular belief, he did not die in poverty.

== Career highs ==
He might be called an "unsung hero" of railway history. He was responsible for the experimental pneumatic railway at Crystal Palace. The Crystal Palace atmospheric or pneumatic railway was built in 1864 at the lower end of the Crystal Palace Park, and was working for a matter of months. It ran for about 600 yards in a 10-ft diameter brick tunnel between the Sydenham and Penge gates to the Park. The tunnel had a gradient of one in 15 and the railway went round in a sharp curve. It had a coach which could seat 35, and a sliding door at each end. There was a remote steam engine coupled to a fan.

The railway had a collar of bristles which made it airtight and enabled the coach to be sucked along - at a speed of probably 25 mph. The trip apparently cost sixpence. He was also involved with the abandoned Waterloo and Whitehall Railway under the Thames between Waterloo and Charing Cross railway stations. He wrote "A New Plan for Street Railways".

== See also ==
- Crystal Palace pneumatic railway
- London Pneumatic Despatch Company
