= Crystal Palace pneumatic railway =

1864 experimental atmospheric railway in south London, England

Crystal Palace Pneumatic / Atmospheric Railway
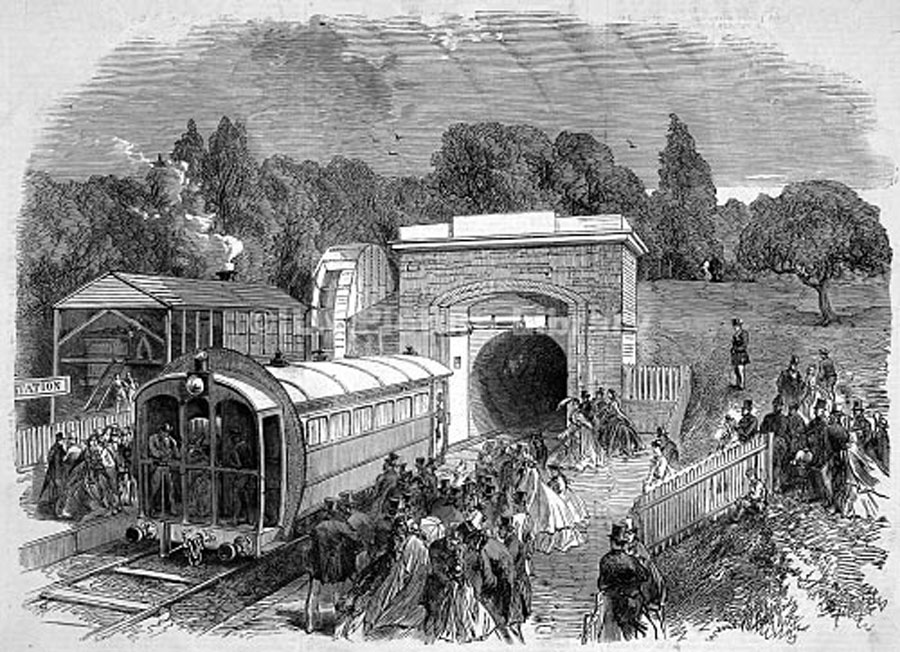
- Engraving of the Crystal Palace line (1864)

Overview
- Dates of operation: August–October 1864
- Predecessor: None
- Successor: Waterloo and Whitehall Railway

Technical
- Track gauge: Broad gauge
- Length: 600 yd (550 m)

The Crystal Palace Pneumatic Railway was an experimental atmospheric railway that ran in Crystal Palace Park in south London in 1864.

== History ==
The railway was designed by Thomas Webster Rammell, who had previously built a pneumatic railway for the London Pneumatic Despatch Company to convey letters along tunnels in large vacuum-driven wagons. A similar principle was applied to this railway, where a carriage fitted with a large collar of bristles was sucked along an airtight tunnel that measured 10 by 9 feet (3.0 by 2.7 metres). The bristle collar served to keep the tunnel "partially airtight". It operated for just over two months, and may have been a demonstration line for a more substantial atmospheric railway planned between Waterloo and Whitehall, construction of which was started under the Thames but never completed.

The tunnel was built in a shallow trench of 4 feet (1.2 m) in depth; the contemporary illustration (right) showing the line disappearing beneath the landscape seems to be no more than artistic licence although, as built, earth may have been drawn up around the structure. In the tunnel the bridge-profile rails were on longitudinal sleepers whereas in the platform sections conventional cross sleepers were used. Rammell included a curve of 8 chains (161 m) radius and a gradient of 1 in 15 (7 per cent) to demonstrate the capabilities of his design. The power was provided by a large fan, some 22 ft (6.7 m) in diameter, like a paddle-wheel in an iron case (see image) that was powered at 300rpm by a former steam locomotive, mounted on a plinth, acting through leather belts. An arched brick tunnel 8 feet (2.4 m) high led from a below-ground chamber in the engine house to the side of the running tunnel. The carriage at the upper terminus was allowed to enter the tunnel under its own weight, when "a pair of iron doors, hinged like lock gates" was closed behind it. Air at a pressure of "2 1/2 ounces per square inch" (about 0.16 psi or 11 mbar) was then admitted through a grating, propelling the vehicle to the other terminus. As the vehicle approached the lower terminus it was slowed by a short, uphill section of track and the release of the propelling air pressure as it passed a grating open to the atmosphere; the only intervention required from the operator was the application of the brake.

On return journeys, the fan was reversed to create a vacuum to suck the carriage backwards, whilst the carriage used its brakes to come to a stop. A contemporary newspaper account called for steps to prevent any mechanical failure subjecting passengers to effects of vacuum like "frogs under a vacuum pump". Although not positively known, it is possible that the GWR broad gauge (7 ft 0 1/4 in (2.14 m)) was used. The single coach might have also been a conversion of a GWR coach, and the steam engine that powered the fan from an old GWR locomotive.

== Operations ==
The tunnel ran for 600 yards (550 metres) between the Sydenham and Penge entrances to the park, and had to negotiate a difficult bend along the line. Tickets cost sixpence each. Trains ran between 1pm and 6pm and the journey time was 50 seconds. The line operated from 27 August 1864 to October 1864.

== Legacy ==
It is unclear what became of the line, as records do not state what happened after it ceased to operate, although it has been suggested that Rammell had originally constructed the small line as a test for a larger atmospheric railway that was to run between Waterloo and Whitehall. A formal excavation was conducted at the site of the upper station in August 1975. A brick tunnel, too small to be the running tunnel, and what is thought to be a retaining wall were found. The running tunnel was not found, and some believed that it may have been destroyed by construction work for the Festival of Empire celebrations in 1911.

It has been rumoured that the site of the railway is haunted, a popular urban legend of the 1930s partially connected with stories surrounding Crystal Palace railway station. In 1978, a woman claimed to have found the tunnel and to have seen within it an old railway carriage filled with skeletons in Victorian outfits. This legend has been developed into the novel Strange Air by fantasy writer Tom Brown.

== See also ==
- Atmospheric railway
- Beach Pneumatic Transit – a similar atmospheric railway that operated in New York City, United States
