= Rammell Mountain =

Mountain in the state of Wyoming

- Location within Wyoming Location within the United States

Highest point
- Elevation: 10,140 ft (3,090 m)
- Prominence: 340 ft (100 m)
- Coordinates: 43°54′11″N 110°54′06″W

Geography
- Location: Caribou-Targhee National Forest, Teton County, Wyoming, US
- Parent range: Teton Range
- Topo map: USGS Rammell Mountain

Climbing
- Easiest route: Hike

Rammell Mountain (10,140 feet (3,090 m)) is located in the Teton Range in the U.S. state of Wyoming. The peak is in the Jedediah Smith Wilderness of Caribou-Targhee National Forest.
