= London Pneumatic Despatch Company =

Railway company

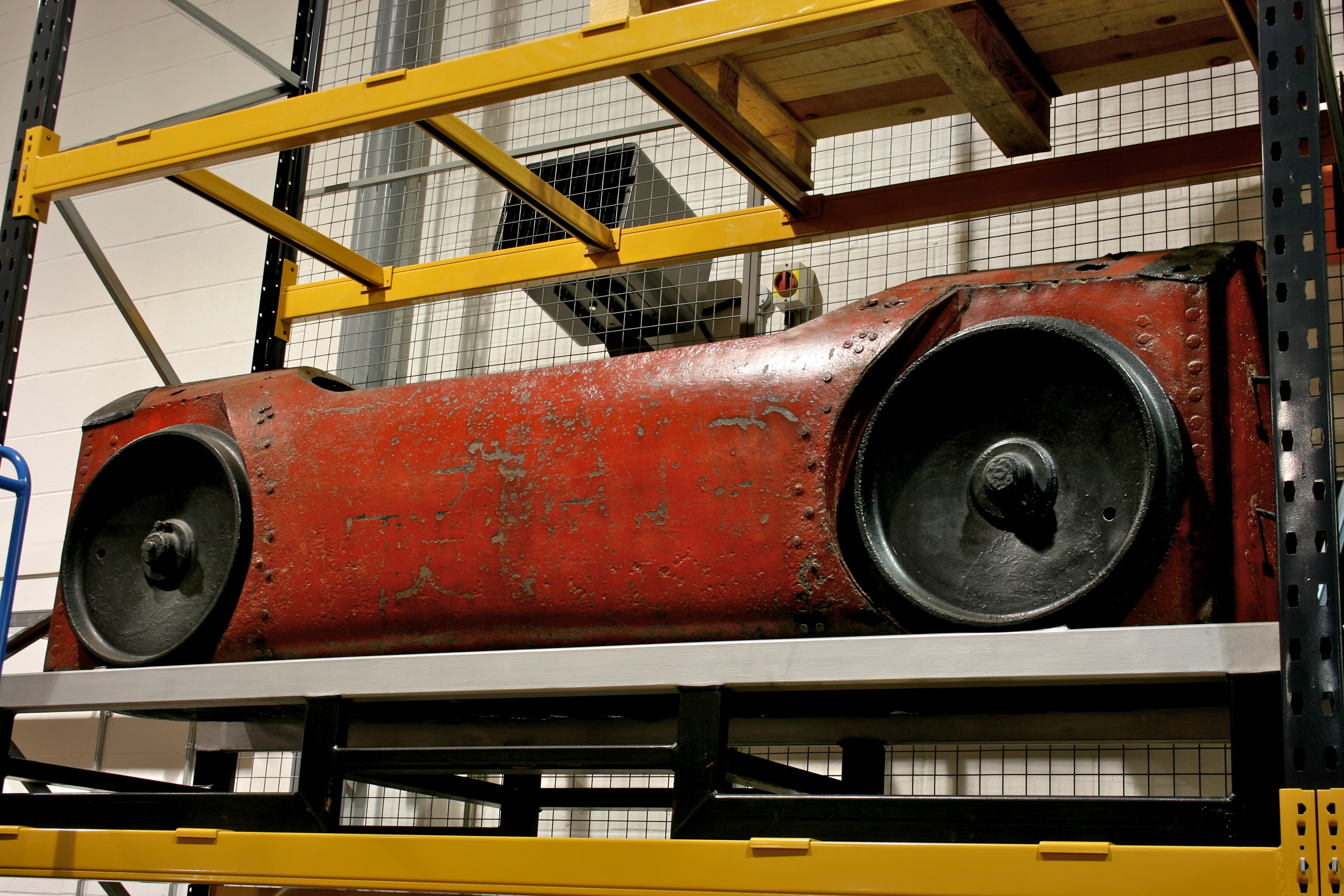
Pneumatic Despatch Company vehicle

The London Pneumatic Despatch Company (also known as the London Pneumatic Dispatch Company) was formed on 30 June 1859, to design, build and operate an underground railway system for the carrying of mail, parcels and light freight between locations in London. The system was used between 1863 and 1874.

== Background ==
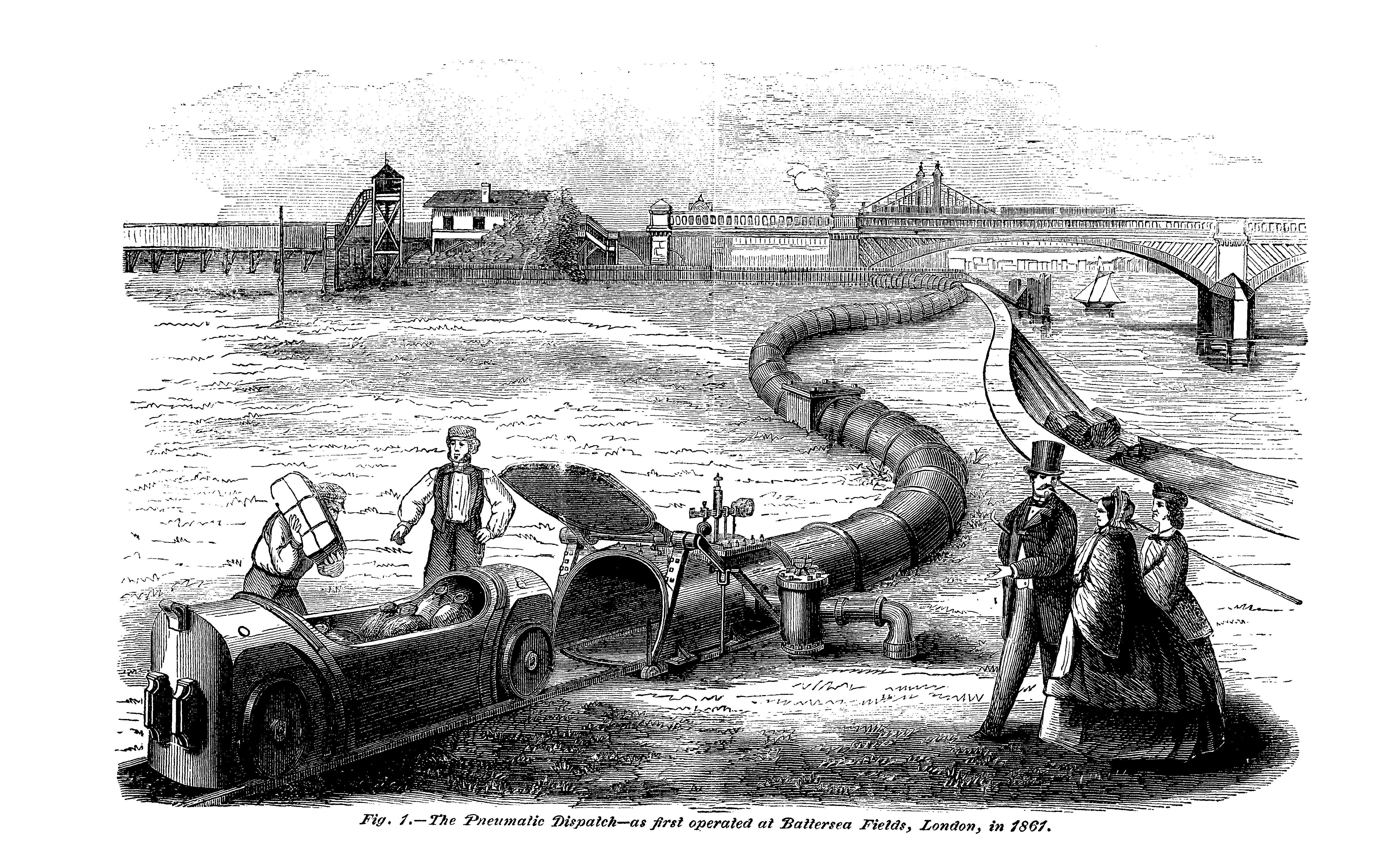
Testing at Battersea

Sir Rowland Hill of the General Post Office commissioned two engineers to investigate the feasibility of a pneumatic tube-based system between the General Post Office and the West District Central Post Office. In 1855 and 1856 they reported favourably but there would be significant cost. The scheme was not pursued.

In 1859 Thomas Webster Rammell and Josiah Latimer Clark proposed an underground tube network in central London "for the more speedy and convenient circulation of despatches and parcels".

The company was founded by the Pneumatic Dispatch Company's Act 1859 with offices at 6 Victoria Street, Westminster. Capital of £150,000 was sought through 15,000 shares at £10 each. The company's directors were its chairman Richard Temple-Grenville, 3rd Duke of Buckingham and Chandos, deputy chairman Mark Huish, Thomas Brassey, Edwin Clark, the Hon. William Napier, John Horatio Lloyd, William Henry Smith and Sir Charles Henry John Rich.

With initial funding of £25,000 (equivalent to £2.7 million in 2025), the company tested the technology and constructed a pilot route at the Soho Foundry of Boulton and Watt in Birmingham. The first full-scale trial was at Battersea during the summer of 1861. A single tube was installed, 452 yards long, with curves of up to 300 feet (91 m) radius and gradients of up to 1 in 22. 2 ft (610 mm) narrow gauge track was cast inside the tube. Wheeled capsules were fitted with vulcanised rubber flaps to make an air seal. Power was provided by a 30 horse-power steam engine with a 21 feet (6.4 m) diameter Waddle fan. Single capsules weighed up to 3 tonnes, and achieved speeds up to 40 mph (60 km/h).

== Operation ==
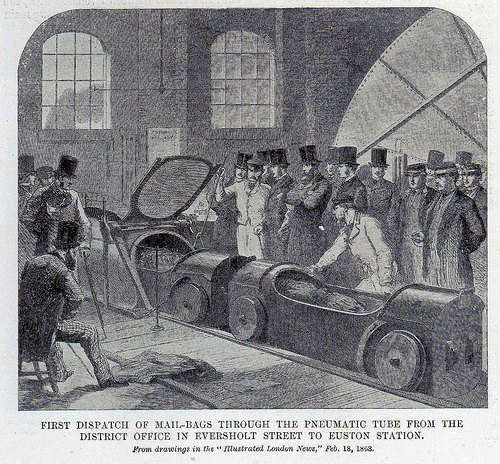
First dispatch of mail bags through the pneumatic tube from the district office in Eversholt Street to Euston Station. Illustrated London News, 28 February 1863

A permanent line of 2 ft (610 mm) narrow gauge was constructed between Euston railway station and the North West District Post Office in Eversholt Street, a distance of approximately a third of a mile. The line was tested from 15 January 1863, and operation started on 20 February 1863. A capsule conveying up to 35 bags of mail could make the short journey between terminals in one minute. Thirteen journeys were operated each day, with a daily operating cost of £1 4s 5d (£130 in 2025). The Post Office was charged a nominal fee for use of the service, presumably to encourage them to accept the technology.

A journalist made a report on the first scheme at Euston:

Near the bottom of Euston Square, there is the mouth of the tube, and there are the travelling trucks, ready to be thrust into it; and as we look, a bell rings at some distance up the rail – this is a signal that a mail-train has arrived... At this signal we hear a shovel of coke thrown into a furnace, a small steam-engine begins to beat swiftly... the pneumatic wheel ... is twenty-one feet in diameter, and is composed of two discs of iron... These discs are braced together by spoke-like partitions, and these partitions communicate with an opening for the entrance of air about the axis. As this wheel rapidly revolves, the air is sucked in at its centre, and thrown off ... at its open rim or edge. This gale is not allowed to disperse itself, however, but when any work has to be done, is confined within a paddle-box, and allowed to pass out ... through a pipe in connection with the great pneumatic despatch tube... Here, then, we have the means of pulling or pushing the travelling carriages along their subterranean road, and as we speak we see it in operation: for a mail-guard opens a door, throws in two or three mail-bags just snatched out of the guard's van as it rolls into the [mainline] station, the iron carriages are shoved into the tube, the air-tight door at its mouth is closed... and we hear them rumbling off on their subterranean journey at a rate, we are informed, of twenty miles an hour... a bell connected with an electric telegraph warns him that the attendant at the other end of the tube is about to thrust the carriage into the tube on its return journey. It has been pushed along... by the pressure of air thrown out by the wheel, but it has to be pulled back by suction; the valve of the suction-pipe, in the connection with the centre of the disc, is accordingly opened, and speedily we hear a hollow rumbling, and out shoots the carriage, ready once more for fresh bags.

— The Living Age, Volume 77, Issue 984, 1863

The company sought to develop further lines within London, and attempted to raise an additional £125,000 (£14 million in 2025), of capital. The prospectus proposed a network of lines between "points so important that it is unnecessary to dwell upon the magnitude of the traffic that must naturally arise between them". The first line was to have been a route linking the Camden Town and Euston (Square) stations of the London and North Western Railway.

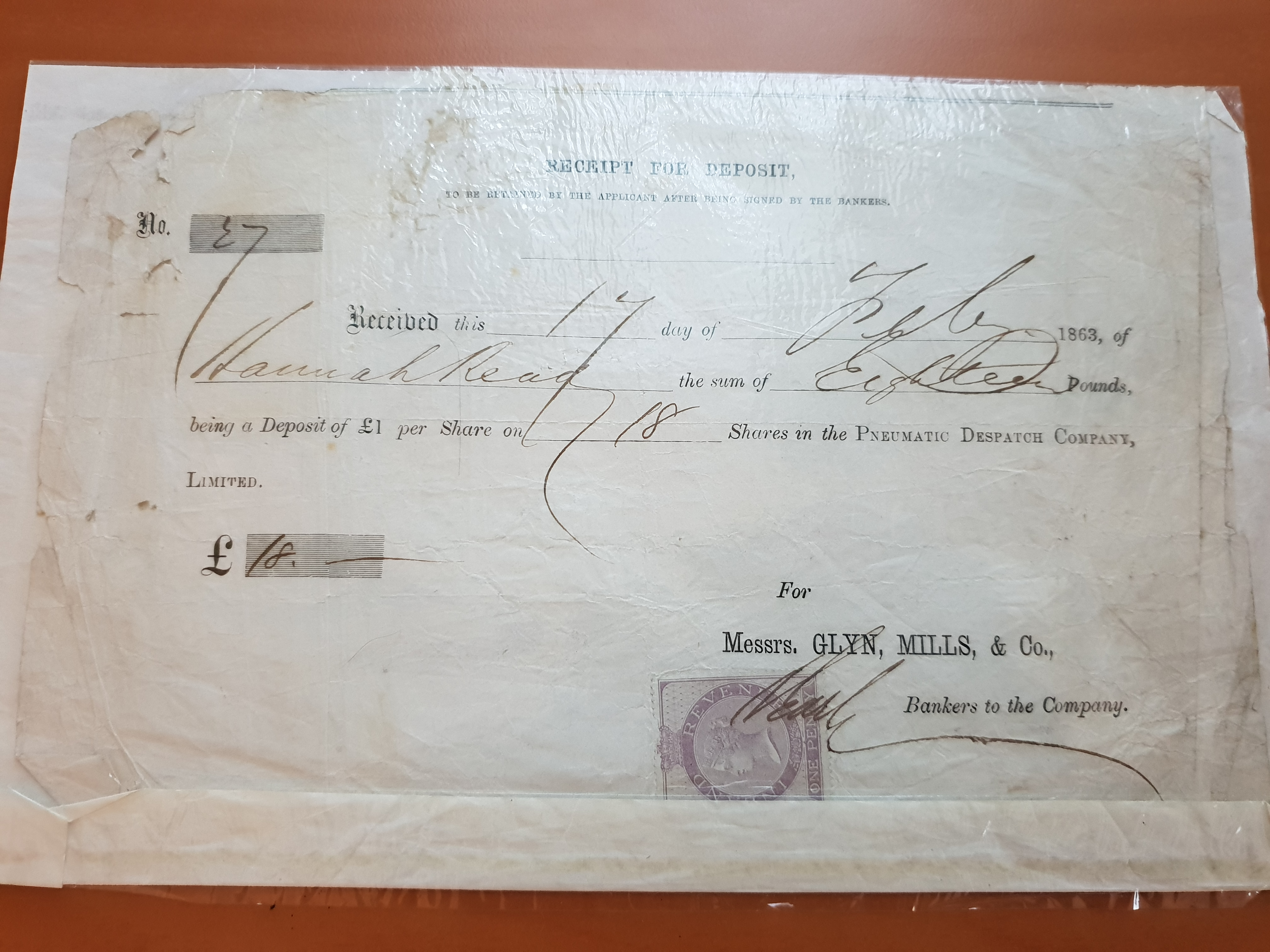
Receipt for purchase of 18 shares in the Pneumatic Despatch Company at @ £1 each

Work started on a 3 ft 8 1/2 in (1,130 mm) narrow gauge line from Euston to Holborn in September 1863. The tubes were constructed by the Staveley Coal and Iron Company. The first 'trains' ran on 10 October 1865 after a demonstration in which the chairman, Richard Temple-Grenville, 3rd Duke of Buckingham and Chandos, travelled from Holborn to Euston in one of the capsules.

Another line from Holborn to Gresham Street via the General Post Office on St Martin's le Grand was authorised by the Pneumatic Despatch Company's Act 1864 and was under construction in 1865. By the time of the 1866 financial crisis caused by the Overend, Gurney and Company collapse, a 3/8-mile (0.60 km) tube from Holborn to Hatton Garden had been constructed. Total expenditure so far was £150,000 (£15 million in 2025).

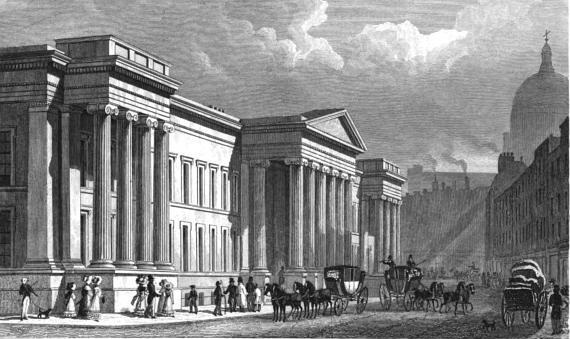
General Post Office in St Martin's le Grand

Construction restarted in 1868, and it was completed to St. Martin's le Grand (for the General Post Office) in 1869. Capsules from the General Post Office reached Newgate Street within 17 minutes, at speeds of up to 60 mph.

The company obtained a further act of Parliament on 6 August 1872, the Pneumatic Despatch Company Act 1872, to extend the system.

The Post Office made several trials of the system, but there were not substantial time savings to be made, and by 1874, the Post Office abandoned its use, and the company went into liquidation in 1875. The Edinburgh Evening News reported in 1876 that the trucks containing the parcels continually stuck in the tunnels, and this was the reason for the failure of the company.

In late 1921, an agreement was reached between the Pneumatic Despatch Company and the Postmaster General for the sale for £7,500 (£317,429.6 in 2025) of the remaining infrastructure of "the tube" to the Postmaster General. The agreement recognised that "the Company has not for many years past worked the tube and the same is not now in working order" and that various persons had made unauthorised breaches in the tube as originally constructed. The agreement was confirmed by the Post Office (Pneumatic Tubes Acquisition) Act 1922 which also repealed enactments from 1859, 1864 and 1872 authorising the company.

== Artefacts ==
Two of the original vehicles survive, having been recovered in 1930, one in the Museum of London and the other in the National Railway Museum at York.

== See also ==
- London Post Office Railway
