= SkyTrain =

SkyTrain or Skytrain may refer to:

== Rail transport ==
=== Urban transport ===
- SkyTrain (Metro Manila), a proposed people mover in Metro Manila, Philippines
- SkyTrain (Vancouver), a rapid transit system in Metro Vancouver, Canada
- Accra Skytrain, a proposed rail network in Accra, Ghana
- BTS Skytrain, a rapid transit system in Bangkok, Thailand

=== Airport transport ===
- Skytrain (Miami International Airport), a people mover at Miami International Airport, United States
- ATL Skytrain, a people mover at Hartsfield–Jackson Atlanta International Airport, United States
- Changi Airport Skytrain, a people mover at Singapore Changi Airport, Singapore
- Düsseldorf SkyTrain, a people mover at Düsseldorf Airport, Germany
- PHX Sky Train, a people mover at Phoenix Sky Harbor International Airport, United States
- Soekarno–Hatta Airport Skytrain, a people mover at Soekarno–Hatta International Airport, Indonesia

== Air transport ==
- Douglas C-47 Skytrain also known as the Dakota, a military transport developed from the Douglas DC-3 airliner
- McDonnell Douglas C-9 Skytrain II, a military transport developed from the Douglas DC-9 airliner
- Skytrain, a transatlantic service by Laker Airways

== Other uses ==
- Sky Train, a 1976 album by Barry Miles
- Skytrain Ice Rise, a large ice rise in the Filchner-Ronne ice shelf of Antarctica

== See also ==
- Aerotrain (disambiguation)
- SkyTran
