= Metro-Airport Connection =

Subway-airport rail link in Porto Alegre, Brazil

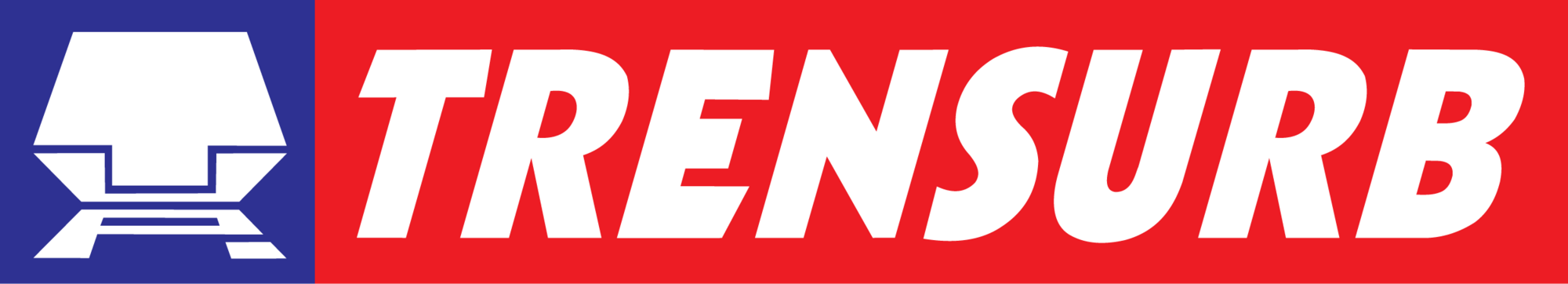

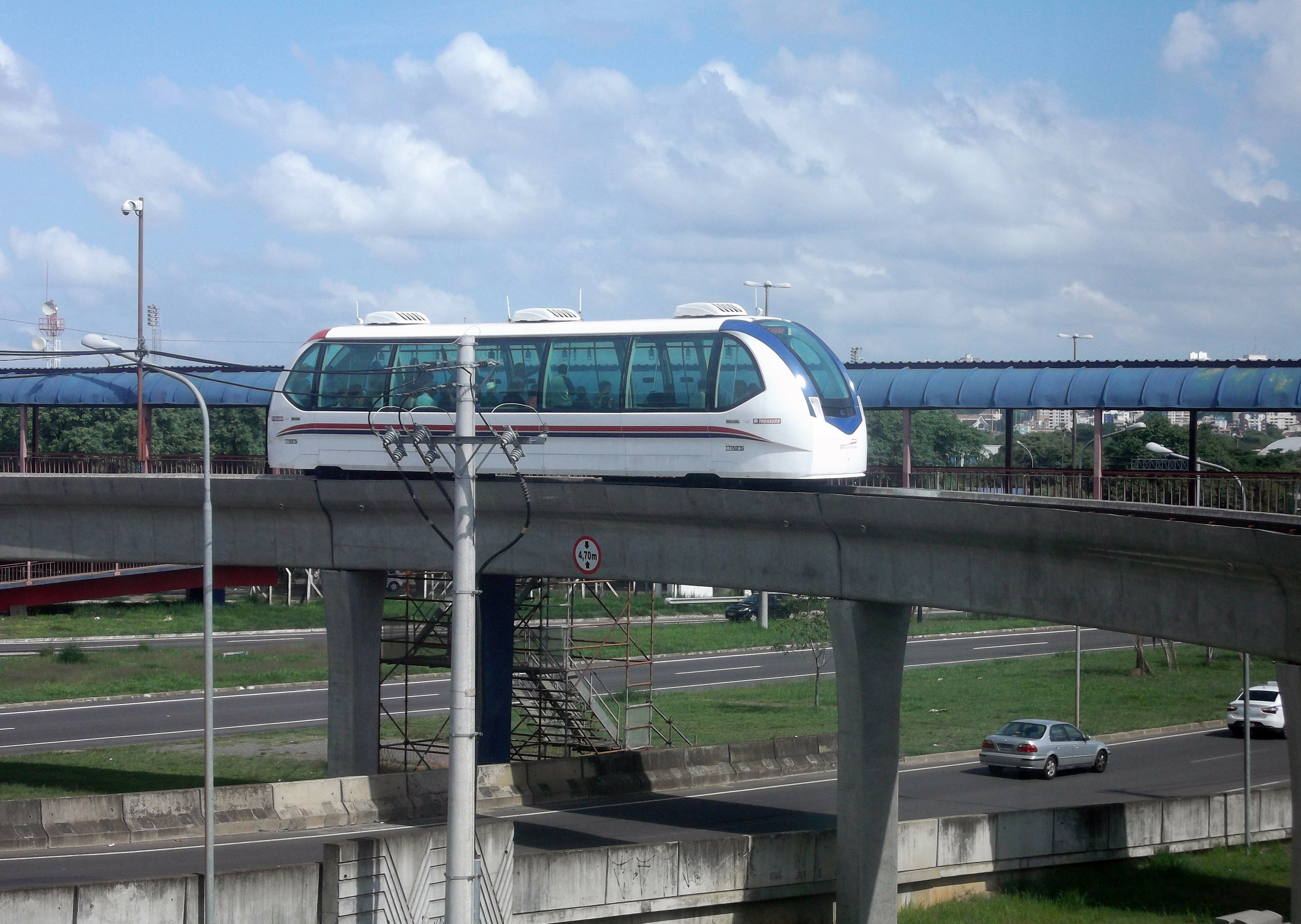
- People mover in operation in Salgado Filho International Airport

Overview
- Status: Out of service
- Owner: Government of the State of Rio Grande do Sul
- Locale: Porto Alegre, Brazil
- Termini: Aeroporto; Terminal 1
- Stations: 2
- Website: www.trensurb.gov.br

Service
- Type: People mover/Airport rail link
- System: Porto Alegre Metro
- Operator(s): Trensurb
- Rolling stock: 3 T'Trans/Aeromóvel Brasil S.A. A-100/200 stock (2 trains)

History
- Opened: 10 August 2013

Technical
- Line length: 1,011 m (3,317 ft)
- Number of tracks: 1
- Character: Fully elevated
- Track gauge: 1,600 mm (5 ft 3 in)
- Minimum radius: 35 m (115 ft)
- Operating speed: 65 km/h (40 mph)
- Signalling: CBTC
- Maximum incline: 3%

Metro-Airport Connection (Portuguese: Conexão Metrô-Aeroporto) is a people mover system operating in Porto Alegre, connecting Aeroporto station of the Porto Alegre Metro to Terminal 1 of the Salgado Filho International Airport. It is operated by Trensurb.

Because of the massive 2024 Rio Grande do Sul floods and the damages on the track, the Aeromóvel is out of service ever since. It is scheduled to return in 2026.

== Characteristics ==
It is composed by a sole elevated track with two stations and 814 m (2,671 ft) of extension, opened to the public on 10 August 2013. Since 7 May 2014, the system operates commercially, initially charging a fare of R$ 1.70 (US$ 0.72 in 2014) and free interchange with Porto Alegre Metro.

The APM used the Aeromovel pneumatic propulsion design, which was developed in Brazil.

== See also ==
- Porto Alegre Metro
- Salgado Filho International Airport
