= Atmospheric railway =

Railway propulsion system using atmospheric pressure

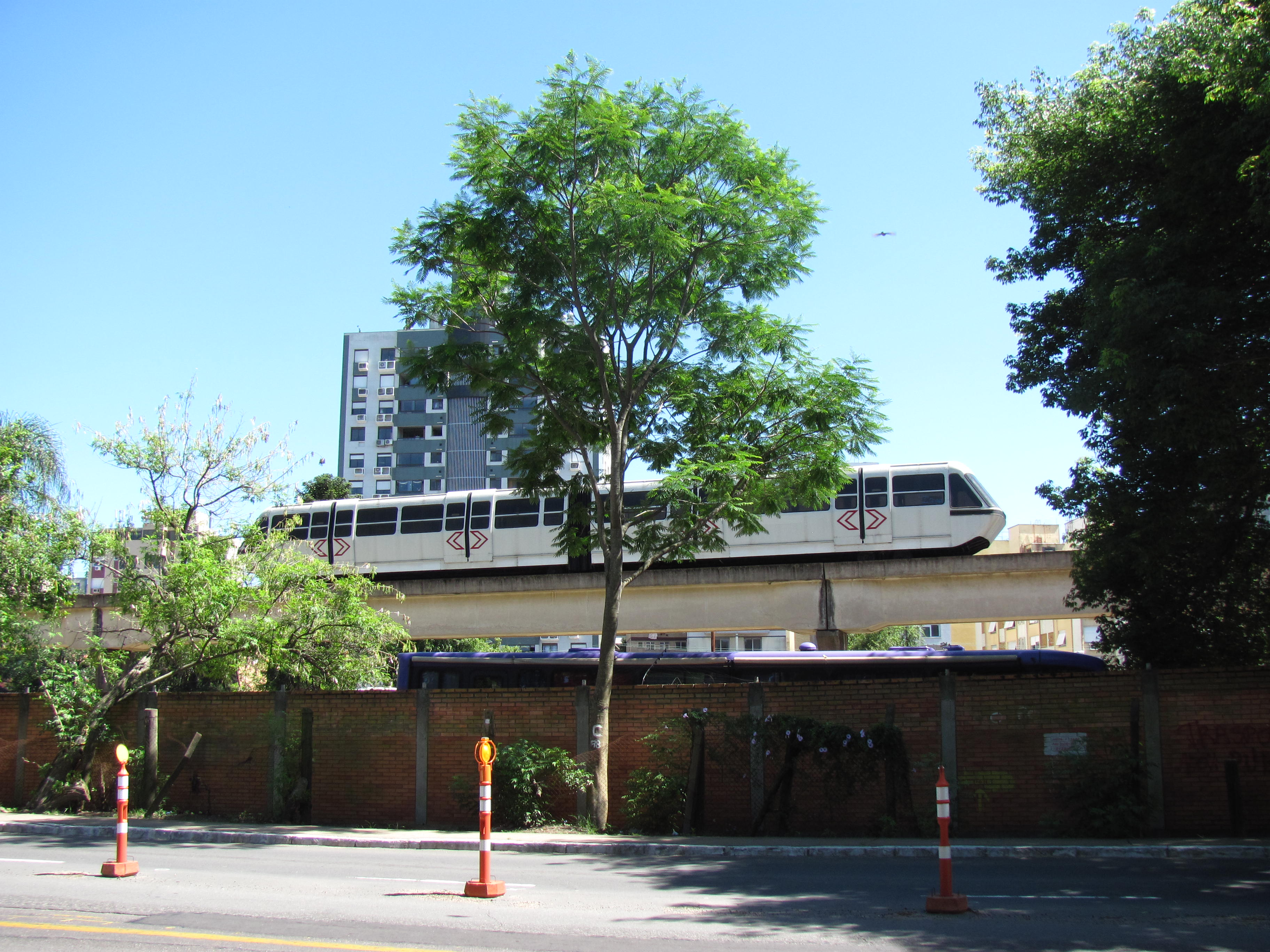
An Aeromovel train in Porto Alegre. The girder under the train forms an air duct. The vehicle is connected to a propulsion plate in the duct which is then driven by air pressure.

An atmospheric railway uses differential air pressure to provide power for propulsion of a railway vehicle. A static power source can transmit motive power to the vehicle in this way, avoiding the necessity of carrying mobile power generating equipment. The air pressure, or partial vacuum (i.e., negative relative pressure) can be conveyed to the vehicle in a continuous pipe, where the vehicle carries a piston running in the tube. Some form of re-sealable slot is required to enable the piston to be attached to the vehicle. Alternatively the entire vehicle may act as the piston in a large tube or be coupled electromagnetically to the piston.

Several variants of the principle were proposed in the early 19th century, and a number of practical forms were implemented, but all were overcome by unforeseen disadvantages and discontinued within a few years.

A modern proprietary system has been developed and is in use for short-distance applications. Porto Alegre Metro airport connection in Porto Alegre, Brazil, is one of them.

== History ==
In the early days of railways, single vehicles or groups were propelled by men or horses. As mechanical power came to be understood, locomotive engines were developed; the iron horse. These had serious limitations; in particular, being much heavier than the wagons in use, they frequently broke the rails. Also, lack of adhesion (i.e. slip) at the iron-to-iron wheel-rail interface was a limitation, for example in trials on the Kilmarnock and Troon Railway.

Many engineers turned their attention to transmitting power from a static power source, a stationary engine, to a moving train. Such an engine could be more robust and with more available space, potentially more powerful. The solution to transmitting the power, before the days of practical electricity, was the use of either a cable system or air pressure.

=== Medhurst ===
In 1799, George Medhurst of London discussed the idea of moving goods pneumatically through cast iron pipes, and in 1812, he proposed blowing passenger carriages through a tunnel.

Medhurst proposed two alternative systems: either the vehicle itself was the piston, or the tube was relatively small with a separate piston. He never patented his ideas and they were not taken further by him.

== 19th century ==
=== Vallance ===
In 1824, John Vallance patented an atmospheric railway which consisted of a tube sufficiently large to allow carriages with passengers and goods to pass through it. The tube was to be formed from cast-iron cylinders and extend from town to town, with powerful exhausting machinery at one end. The cylindrical carriages would be just less than the inside diameter of the tube and act as pistons, moving under the force of air entering the tube at the open end as air at the other end was pumped out. In 1826 Vallance built a model of the system at his premises in Brighton with a 6-foot (1.8 m) diameter tube. Rails were cast in to the lower part of the tube and bear skin was used to seal the annular space between the tube and the carriage. Braking was accomplished by opening doors at each end of the vehicle. Vallance's system worked, but the scheme was considered uneconomic both because of its costs and because prospective passengers would be repelled by being enclosed in a tube.

=== Pinkus ===
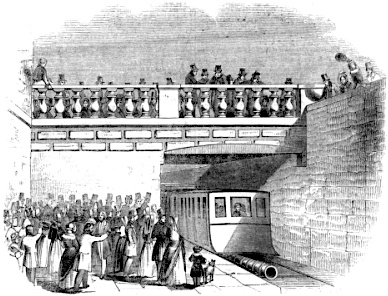
Arriving at Kingstown on the Dalkey Atmospheric Railway in 1844

In 1835, Henry Pinkus patented a system with a 9-square-foot (0.84 m^{2}) square section tube with a low degree of vacuum, limiting leakage loss. He later changed to a small-bore vacuum tube. He proposed to seal the slot that enabled the piston to connect with the vehicle with a continuous rope; rollers on the vehicle lifted the rope in front of the piston connection and returned it afterwards.

He built a demonstration line alongside the Kensington Canal, and issued a prospectus for his National Pneumatic Railway Association. He was unable to interest investors, and his system failed when the rope stretched. However, his concept, a small bore pipe with a resealable slot was the prototype for many successor systems.

=== Samuda and Clegg ===
==== Wormwood Scrubs scheme ====
Jacob and Joseph Samuda were shipbuilders and engineers, and owned the Southwark Ironworks; they were both members of the Institution of Civil Engineers. Samuel Clegg was a gas engineer and they worked in collaboration on their atmospheric system. About 1835, they read Medhurst's writings, and developed a small bore vacuum pipe system. Clegg worked on a longitudinal flap valve, for sealing the slot in the pipe.

In 1838, they took out a patent "for a new improvement in valves" and built a full-scale model at Southwark. In 1840, Jacob Samuda and Clegg leased half a mile of railway line on the West London Railway at Wormholt Scrubs (later renamed Wormwood Scrubs), where the railway had not yet been opened to the public. In that year Clegg left for Portugal, where he was pursuing his career in the gas industry.

Samuda's system involved a continuous (jointed) cast iron pipe laid between the rails of a railway track; the pipe had a slot in the top. The leading vehicle in a train was a piston carriage, which carried a piston inserted in the tube. It was held by a bracket system that passed through the slot, and the actual piston was on a pole ahead of the point at which the bracket left the slot. The slot was sealed from the atmosphere by a continuous leather flap that was opened immediately in advance of the piston bracket and closed again immediately behind it. A pumping station ahead of the train would pump air from the tube, and atmospheric pressure behind the piston would push it forward.

The Wormwood Scrubs demonstration ran for two years. The traction pipe was of 9 inches diameter, and a 16 hp stationary engine was used for power. The gradient on the line was a steady 1 in 115. In his treatise, described below, Samuda implies that the pipe would be used in one direction only, and the fact that only one pumping station was erected suggests that trains were gravitated back to the lower end of the run after the atmospheric ascent, as was later done on the Dalkey line (below). Many of the runs were public. Samuda quotes the loads and degree of vacuum and speed of some of the runs; for example:

- 11 June 1840: 11 tons 10 cwt; maximum speed 22.5 mph; 15 inches of vacuum
- 10 August 1840: 5 tons 0 cwt; maximum speed 30 mph; 20 inches of vacuum.

==== Competing solutions ====
There was enormous public interest in the ideas surrounding atmospheric railways, and at the same time as Samuda was developing his scheme, others put other ideas forward.

- Nickels and Keane propelled trains by pumping air into a continuous canvas tube. The trains had a pair of pinch rollers squeezing the outside of the tube, and the air pressure forced the vehicles forward. The effect was the converse of squeezing a toothpaste tube. They claimed a successful demonstration in a timber yard in Waterloo Road.
- James Pilbrow proposed a loose piston fitted with a toothed rack. Cog wheels would be turned by it, and they were on a spindle passing through glands to the outside of the tube. The leading carriage of the train would have a corresponding rack and be impelled forward by the rotation of the cog wheels. Thus the vehicle would keep pace with the piston exactly, without any direct connection to it.
- Henry Lacey conceived a wooden tube, made by coopers as a long, continuous barrel with the opening slot and a timber flap retained by an india-rubber hinge.
- Clarke and Varley proposed sheet iron tubes with a continuous longitudinal slit. If the tubes were made to precision standards, the vacuum would keep the slit closed, but the piston bracket on the train would spring the slit open enough to pass. The elasticity of the tube would close it again behind the piston carriage.
- Joseph Shuttleworth suggested a hydraulic tube where water pressure rather than a partial atmospheric vacuum would propel the train. In mountainous areas where plentiful water was available, a pumping station would be unnecessary: the water would be used directly. Instead of the flap to seal the slot in the tube, a continuous shaped sealing rope, made of cloth impregnated with india-rubber would be within the pipe. Guides on the piston would lift it into position and the water pressure would hold it in place behind the train. Use of a positive pressure enabled a greater pressure differential than a vacuum system. However, the water in the pipe would have to be drained manually by staff along the pipe after every train.

==== Samuda's treatise ====
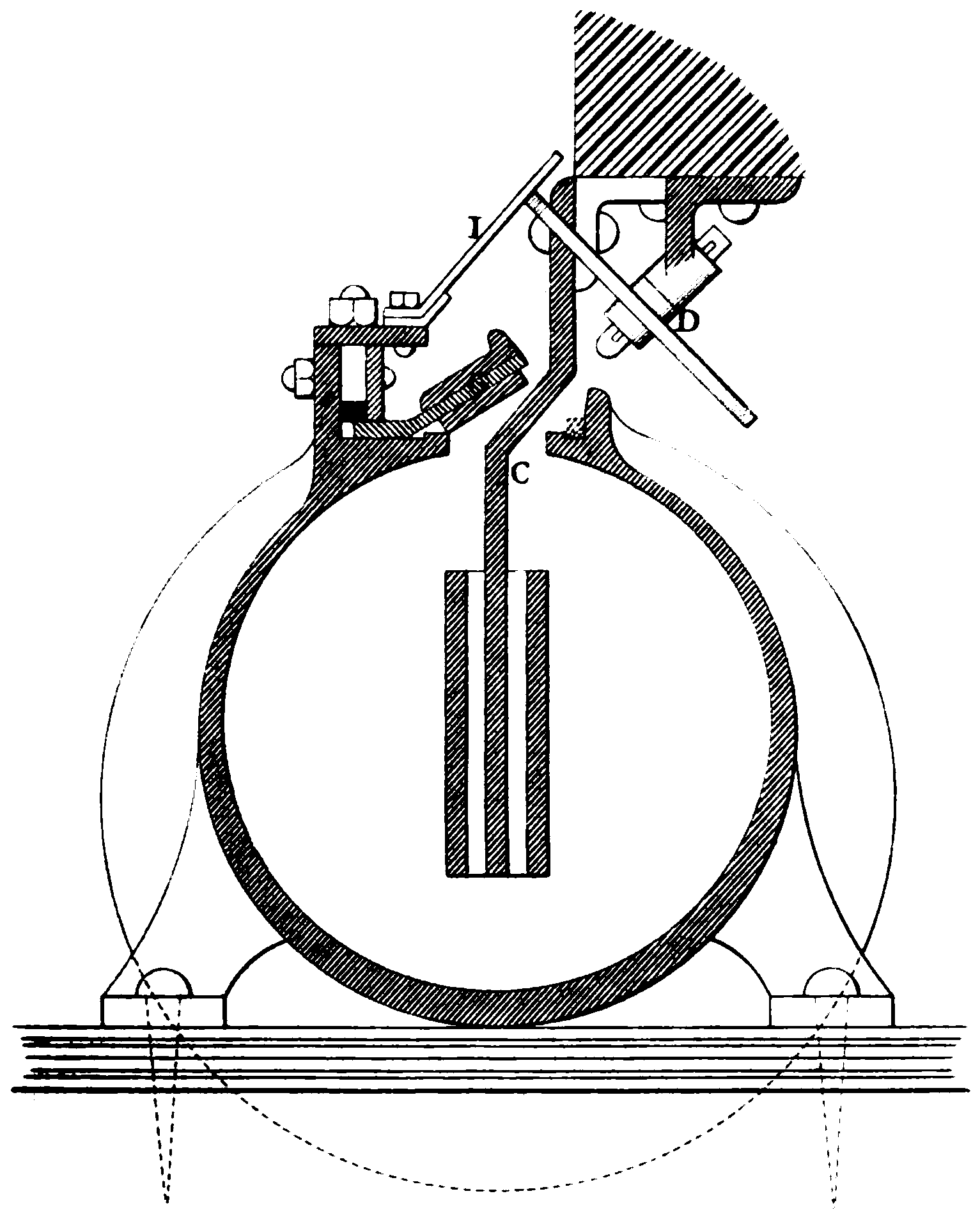
Illustration from A Treatise on the Adaptation of Atmospheric Pressure to the Purposes of Locomotion on Railways, Samuda

In 1841, Joseph Samuda published A Treatise on the Adaptation of Atmospheric Pressure to the Purposes of Locomotion on Railways.

It ran to 50 pages, and Samuda described his system; first the traction pipe:

The moving power is communicated to the train through a continuous pipe or main, laid between the rails, which is exhausted by air pumps worked by stationary steam engines, fixed on the road side, the distance between them varying from one to three miles, according to the nature and traffic of the road. A piston, which is introduced into this pipe, is attached to the leading carriage in each train, through a lateral opening, and is made to travel forward by means of the exhaustion created in front of it. The continuous pipe is fixed between the rails and bolted to the sleepers which carry them; the inside of the tube is unbored, but lined or coated with tallow 1/10th of an inch thick, to equalize the surface and prevent any unnecessary friction from the passage of the travelling piston through it.

The operation of the closure valve was to be critical:

Along the upper surface of the pipe is a continuous slit or groove about two inches wide. This groove is covered by a valve, extending the whole length of the railway, formed of a strip of leather riveted between iron plates, the top plates being wider than the groove and serving to prevent the external air forcing the leather into the pipe when the vacuum is formed within it; and the lower plates fitting into the groove when the valve is shut, makes up the circle of the pipe, and prevents the air from passing the piston; one edge of this valve is securely held down by iron bars, fastened by screw bolts to a longitudinal rib cast on the pipe, and allows the leather between the plates and the bar to act as a hinge, similar to a common pump valve; the other edge of the valve falls into a groove which contains a composition of beeswax and tallow: this composition is solid at the temperature of the atmosphere, and becomes fluid when heated a few degrees above it. Over this valve is a protecting cover, which serves to preserve it from snow or rain, formed of thin plates of iron about five feet long hinged with leather, and the end of each plate underlaps the next in the direction of the piston's motion, (Note: Yet as single line operation was envisaged, this seems to be impossible.) thus ensuring the lifting of each in succession.

The piston carriage would open and then close the valve:

To the underside of the first carriage in each train is attached the piston and its appurtenances; a rod passing horizontally from the piston is attached to a connecting arm, about six feet behind the piston. This connecting arm passes through the continuous groove in the pipe, and being fixed to the carriage, imparts motion to the train as the tube becomes exhausted; to the piston rod are also attached four steel wheels, (two in advance and two behind the connecting arm,) which serve to lift the valve, and form a space for the passage of the connecting arm, and also for the admission of air to the back of the piston; another steel wheel is attached to the carriage, regulated by a spring, which serves to ensure the perfect closing of the valve, by running over the top plates immediately after the arm has passed. A copper tube or heater, about ten feet long, constantly kept hot by a small stove, also fixed to the underside of the carriage, passes over and melts the surface of the composition (which has been broken by lifting the valve,) which upon cooling becomes solid, and hermetically seals the valve. Thus each train in passing leaves the pipe in a fit state to receive the next train.

Entering and leaving the pipe was described:

The continuous pipe is divided into suitable sections (according to the respective distance of the fixed steam engines) by separating valves, which are opened by the train as it goes along: these valves are so constructed that no stoppage or diminution of speed is necessary in passing from one section to another. The exit separating valve, or that at the end of the section nearest to its steam engine, is opened by the compression of air in front of the piston, which necessarily takes place after it has passed the branch which communicates with the air-pump; the entrance separating valve, (that near the commencement of the next section of pipe,) is an equilibrium or balance valve, and opens immediately the piston has entered the pipe. The main pipe is put together with deep socket joints, in each of which an annular space is left about the middle of the packing, and filled with a semi-fluid: thus any possible leakage of air into the pipe is prevented.

At that time railways were developing rapidly, and solutions to the technical limitations of the day were eagerly sought, and not always rationally evaluated. Samuda's treatise put forward the advantages of his system:

- transmission of power to trains from static (atmospheric) power stations; the static machinery could be more fuel efficient;
- the train would be relieved of the necessity of carrying the power source, and fuel, with it;
- power available to the train would be greater so that steeper gradients could be negotiated; in building new lines this would hugely reduce construction costs by enabling reducing earthworks and tunnels;
- elimination of a heavy locomotive from the train would enable lighter and cheaper track materials to be used;
- passengers, and lineside residents, would be spared the nuisance of smoke emission from passing trains; this would be especially useful in tunnels;
- collisions between trains would be impossible, because only one train at a time could be handled on any section between two pumping stations; collisions were at the forefront of the mind of the general public in those days before modern signalling systems, when a train was permitted to follow a preceding train after a defined time interval, with no means of detecting whether that train had stalled somewhere ahead on the line;
- the piston travelling in the tube would hold the piston carriage down and, Samuda claimed, prevent derailments, enabling curves to be negotiated safely at high speed;
- persons on the railway would not be subjected to the risk of steam engine boiler explosions (then a very real possibility).

Samuda also rebutted criticisms of his system that had become widespread:

- that if a pumping station failed the whole line would be closed because no train could pass that point; Samuda explained that a pipe arrangement would enable the next pumping station ahead to supply that section; if this was at reduced pressure, the train would nonetheless be able to pass, albeit with a small loss of time;
- that leakage of air at the flap or the pipe joints would critically weaken the vacuum effect; Samuda pointed to experience and test results on his demonstration line, where this was evidently not a problem;
- the capital cost of the engine houses was a huge burden; Samuda observed that the capital cost of steam locomotives was eliminated, and running costs for fuel and maintenance could be expected to be lower.

==== Patent ====
In April 1844, Jacob and Joseph Samuda took out a patent for their system. Soon after this, Joseph Samuda died and it was left to his brother Jacob to continue the work. The patent was in three parts: the first describing the atmospheric pipe and piston system, the second describing how in areas of plentiful water supply, the vacuum might be created by using tanks of water at differing levels; and the third section dealt with level crossings of an atmospheric railway.

=== Dalkey Atmospheric Railway ===
The Dublin and Kingstown Railway opened in 1834 connecting the port of Dún Laoghaire (then called Kingstown) to Dublin, Ireland; it was a standard gauge line. In 1840, it was desired to extend the line to Dalkey, a distance of about two miles. A horse tramway on the route was acquired and converted: it had been used to bring stone from a quarry for the construction of the harbour. It was steeply graded (at 1 in 115 with a 440-yard stretch of 1 in 57) and heavily curved, the sharpest being 570 yards radius. This presented significant difficulties to the locomotives then in use. The treasurer of the company, James Pim, was visiting London and hearing of Samuda's project he viewed it. He considered it to be perfect for the requirements of his company, and after petitioning government for a loan of £26,000, it was agreed to install it on the Dalkey line. Thus became the Dalkey Atmospheric Railway.

A 15-inch traction pipe was used, with a single pumping station at Dalkey, at the upper end of the 2,400-yard run. The engine created 110 ihp and had a flywheel of 36 feet diameter. Five minutes before the scheduled departure of a train from Kingstown, the pumping engine started work, creating a 15-inch vacuum in two minutes. The train was pushed manually to the position where the piston entered the pipe, and the train was held on the brakes until it was ready to start. When that time came, the brakes were released and the train moved off. (The electric telegraph was later installed, obviating reliance on the timetable for engine operation.)

On 17 August 1843, the tube was exhausted for the first time, and the following day a trial run was made. On Saturday 19 August, the line was opened to the public. (Note: Kingstown station was not ready and the runs started from Glasthule Bridge.) In service, a typical speed of 30 mph was attained; return to Kingstown was by gravitation down the gradient, and slower. By March 1844, 35 train movements operated daily, and 4,500 passengers a week travelled on the line, mostly simply for the novelty.

It is recorded that a young man called Frank Elrington was on one occasion on the piston carriage, which was not attached to the train. On releasing the brake, the light vehicle shot off at high speed, covering the distance in 75 seconds, averaging 65 mph (105 km/h).

As this was the first commercially operating atmospheric railway, it attracted the attention of many eminent engineers of the day, including Isambard Kingdom Brunel, Robert Stephenson, and Sir William Cubitt.

The line continued to operate successfully for ten years, outliving the atmospheric system on British lines, although the Paris – Saint Germain line continued until 1860.

When the system was abolished in 1855, a 2-2-2 steam locomotive named Princess was employed, incidentally the first steam engine to be manufactured in Ireland. Although a small machine, it successfully worked the steeply graded line for some years.

=== Paris – Saint Germain ===
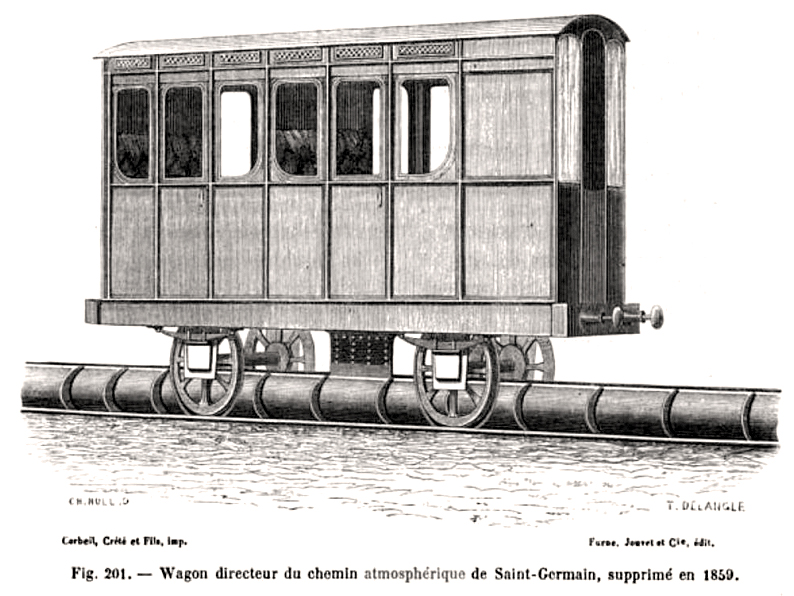
Saint Germain piston carriage

In 1835, the brothers Pereire obtained a concession from the Compagnie du Chemin de fer de Paris à Saint-Germain. They opened their 19 km line in 1837, but only as far as Le Pecq, a river quay on the left bank of the Seine, as a daunting incline would have been necessary to reach Saint-Germain-en-Laye, and locomotives of the day were considered incapable of climbing the necessary gradient, adhesion being considered the limiting factor.

On hearing of the success of the Dalkey railway, the French minister of public works (M. Teste) and under-secretary of state (M. Le Grande) dispatched M. Mallet, (Note: Possibly C.-F. Mallet) inspecteur général honoraire des Ponts et Chaussées, to Dalkey. He wrote an exhaustive technical evaluation of the system installed there, and its potential, which included the results of measurements made with Joseph Samuda.

It was through his interest that the Pereire brothers decided to adopt the system for an extension to Saint Germain itself, and construction started in 1845, with a wooden bridge crossing the Seine followed by a twenty-arch masonry viaduct and two tunnels under the castle. The extension was opened on 15 April 1847; it was 1.5 km in length on a gradient of 1 in 28 (35 mm/m).

The traction pipe was laid between the rails; it had a diameter of 63 cm (25 in) with a slot at the top. The slot was closed by two leather flaps. The pumps were powered by two steam engines with a capacity of 200 hp, located between the two tunnels at Saint-Germain. Train speed on the ascent was 35 km/h (22 mph). On the descent the train ran by gravity as far as Pecq, where the steam locomotive took over for the run to Paris.

The system was technically successful, but the development of more powerful steam locomotives led to its abandonment from 3 July 1860, when steam locomotive ran throughout from Paris to Saint Germain, being assisted by a pusher locomotive up the gradient. This arrangement continued for more than sixty years until the electrification of the line.

A correspondent of the Ohio State Journal described some details; there seem to have been two tube sections:

An iron tube is laid down in the centre of the track, which is sunk about one-third of its diameter in the bed of the road. For a distance of 5,500 yards the tube has a diameter of only 1¾ feet [i.e. 21 inches], the ascent here being so slight as not to require the same amount of force as is required on the steep grade to Saint Germain, where the pipe, for a distance of 3,800 yards, is 2 feet 1 inch [i.e. 25 inches] in diameter.

The steam engines had accumulators:

To each engine is adapted two large cylinders, which exhaust fourteen cubic feet of air per second. The pressure in the air cauldron (claudieres) attached to the exhausting machines is equal to six absolute atmospheres.

He described the valve:

Throughout the entire length of the tube, a section is made in the top, leaving an open space of about five inches. In each cut edge of the section there is an offset, to catch the edges of a valve which fits down upon it. The valve is made of a piece of sole leather half an inch thick, having plates of iron attached to it on both the upper and corresponding under side to give it strength ... which are perhaps one-fourth of an inch in thickness ... The plates are about nine inches long, and their ends, above and below, are placed three quarters of an inch apart, forming joints, so as to give the leather valve pliability, and at the same time firmness.

Clayton records the name of the engineer, Mallet, who had been Inspector general of Public Works, and gives a slightly different account: Clayton says that Mallet used a plaited rope to seal the slot. He also says that vacuum was created by condensing steam in a vacuum chamber between runs, but that may have been a misunderstanding of the pressure accumulators.

=== London and Croydon Railway ===
==== Steam railway ====
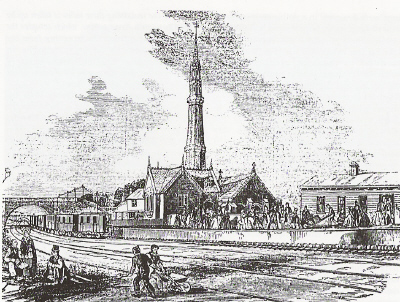
Jolly-sailor station on the London and Croydon Railway in 1845, showing the pumping station, and the locomotive-less train

The London and Croydon Railway (L&CR) obtained its authorising act of Parliament, the London and Croydon Railway Act 1835 (5 & 6 Will. 4. c. x), to build its line from a junction with the London and Greenwich Railway (L&GR) to Croydon. At that time the L&GR line was under construction, and Parliament resisted the building of two railway termini in the same quarter of London, so that the L&CR would have to share the L&GR's London Bridge station. The line was built for ordinary locomotive operation. A third company, the London and Brighton Railway (L&BR), was promoted, and it too had to share the route into London by running over the L&CR.

When the lines opened in 1839, it was found that congestion arose due to the frequent stopping services on the local Croydon line; this was particularly a problem on the 1 in 100 ascent from New Cross to Dartmouth Arms. The L&CR engineer, William Cubitt, proposed a solution to the problem: a third track would be laid on the east side of the existing double track main line, and all the local trains in both directions would use it. The faster Brighton trains would be freed of the delay following a stopping train. Cubitt had been impressed during his visit to the Dalkey line, and the new L&CR third track would use atmospheric power. The local line would also be extended to Epsom, also as a single track atmospheric line. These arrangements were adopted and the London and Croydon Railway Act 1843 (6 & 7 Vict. c. lxii) was obtained on 4 July 1843 which gave the necessary powers and also authorised a line to a terminal at Bricklayers Arms. Arrangements were also made with the L&GR for them to add an extra track on the common section of their route. On 1 May 1844, the Bricklayers Arms terminus opened, and a frequent service was run from it, additional to the London Bridge trains.

==== Adoption of atmospheric technology ====
The L&CR line diverged to the south-west at Norwood Junction (then called Jolly Sailor, after an inn), and needed to cross the L&BR line. The atmospheric pipe made this impossible on the flat, and a flyover was constructed to enable the crossing: this was the first example in the railway world. This was in the form of a wooden viaduct with approach gradients of 1 in 50. A similar flyover was to be built at Corbetts Lane Junction, where the L&CR additional line was to be on the north-east side of the existing line, but this was never made.

A 15-inch diameter traction pipe was installed between Forest Hill (then called Dartmouth Arms, also after a local inn) and Croydon (later renamed West Croydon). Although Samuda supervised the installation of the atmospheric apparatus, a weather flap, a hinged iron plate that covered the leather slot valve in the Dalkey installation, was omitted. The L&CR had an Atmospheric Engineer, James Pearson. Maudslay, Son and Field supplied the three 100 hp steam engines and pumps at Dartmouth Arms, Jolly Sailor and Croydon, and elaborate engine houses had been erected for them. They were designed in a gothic style by W. H. Brakespear, and had tall chimneys which also exhausted the evacuated air at high level. (Note: This may mean that the exhaust air was used to create a draught for the fires.)

A two-needle electric telegraph system was installed on the line, enabling station staff to indicate to the remote engine house that a train was ready to start.

This section, from Dartmouth Arms to Croydon, began operation on the atmospheric system in January 1846.

The traction pipe slot and the piston bracket were handed; that is the slot closure flap was continuously hinged on one side, and the piston support bracket was cranked to minimise the necessary opening of the flap. This meant that the piston carriage could not simply be turned on a turntable at the end of a trip. Instead it was double ended, but the piston was manually transferred to the new leading end. The piston carriage itself had to be moved manually (or by horse power) to the leading end of the train. At Dartmouth Arms the station platform was an island between the two steam operated lines. Cubitt designed a special system of pointwork that enabled the atmospheric piston carriage to enter the ordinary track. (Note: It is not known exactly what form these points took, but some early engineers used switches in which the lead rails move together to form a butt joint with the approach rails, and it is likely Cubitt used this. The traction pipe can hardly have crossed the ordinary track, and trains may have been moved by horses.)

The Board of Trade inspector, General Pasley, visited the line on 1 November 1845 to approve it for opening of the whole line. The Times newspaper reported the event. A special train left London Bridge hauled by a steam locomotive; at Forest Hill the locomotive was detached and:

the piston carriage substituted and the train thence became actuated by atmospheric pressure. The train consisted of ten carriages (including that to which the piston is attached) and its weight was upward of fifty tons. At seven and a half minutes past two the train left the point of rest at the Dartmouth Arms, and at eight and three-quarter minutes past, the piston entered the valve, (Note: 75 seconds in moving the train by human or horse power to the pipe.) when it immediately occurred to us that one striking advantage of the system was the gentle, the almost imperceptible, motion on starting. On quitting the station on locomotive lines we have frequently experienced a "jerk" amounting at times to an absolute "shock" and sufficient to alarm the nervous and timid passenger. Nothing of the sort, however, was experienced here. Within a minute and a quarter of the piston entering the pipe, the speed attained against a strong headwind was at the rate of twelve miles an hour; in the next minute, viz. at eleven minutes past two, twenty-five miles an hour; at thirteen minutes past two, thirty-four miles an hour; fourteen minutes past two, forty miles an hour; and fifteen minutes past two, fifty-two miles an hour, which was maintained until sixteen minutes past two, when the speed began to diminish, and at seventeen and a half minutes past two, the train reached the Croydon terminus, thus performing the journey from Dartmouth Arms, five miles, in eight minutes and three-quarters. The barometer in the piston carriage indicated a vacuum of 25 inches and that in the engine house a vacuum of 28 inches. (Note: These values are much higher than Samuda arranged during the Wormwood Scrubbs demonstrations; standard atmospheric pressure is taken as 29.92 in Hg.)

The successful official public run was widely reported, and immediately new schemes for long-distance railways on the atmospheric system were being promoted; the South Devon Railway's shares appreciated overnight.

==== Opening ====
Pasley's report of 8 November was favourable, and the line was clear to open. The directors hesitated, desiring to gain a little more experience beforehand. On 19 December 1845 the crankshaft of the Forest Hill stationary engine fractured, and the engine was unusable. However, the part was quickly replaced and on 16 January 1846, the line opened.

At 11:00 that morning, the crankshaft of one of the Croydon engines broke. Two engines had been provided, so traffic was able to continue using the other, (Note: The Maudsley engines consisted of two engines driving the same shaft; either could be disconnected if required.) until at 7:20 p.m. that engine suffered the same fate. Again repairs were made until 10 February 1846, when both of the Croydon engines failed.

This was a bitter blow for the adherents of the atmospheric system; shortcomings in the manufacture of the stationary engines procured from a reputable engine-maker said nothing about the practicality of the atmospheric system itself, but as Samuda said to the L&CR board:

"The public cannot discriminate (because it cannot know) the cause of the interruptions, and every irregularity is attributed to the atmospheric system."

Two months later, the beam of one of the Forest Hill engines fractured. At this time the directors were making plans for the Epsom extension; they quickly revised their intended purchase of engines from Maudslay, and invited tenders; Boulton and Watt of Birmingham were awarded the contract, their price having been considerably less than those of their competitors.

==== Amalgamation ====
The London and Brighton Railway amalgamated with the L&CR on 6 July 1846, forming the London, Brighton and South Coast Railway (LB&SCR). For the time being the directors of the larger company continued with the L&CR's intentions to use the atmospheric system.

==== Technical difficulties ====
The summer of 1846 was exceptionally hot and dry, and serious difficulties with the traction pipe flap valve started to show themselves. It was essential to make a good seal when the leather flap was closed, and the weather conditions made the leather stiff. As for the tallow-and-beeswax compound that was supposed to seal the joint after every train, Samuda had originally said "this composition is solid at the temperature of the atmosphere, and becomes fluid when heated a few degrees above it" and the hot weather had that effect. Samuda's original description of his system had included a metal weather valve that closed over the flap, but this had been omitted on the L&CR, exposing the valve to the weather, and also encouraging the ingestion of debris, including, an observer reported, a handkerchief dropped by a lady on to the track. Any debris lodging in the seating of the flap could only have reduced its effectiveness.

Moreover, the tallow – that is, rendered animal fat – was attractive to the rat population. An 1859 source reports rats entering the iron tube overnight to eat the tallow, and "hundreds" being killed each morning when the pump was activated for the first train. Delays became frequent, due to inability to create enough vacuum to move the trains, and stoppages on the steep approach inclines at the flyover were commonplace, and widely reported in the press.

The Directors now began to feel uneasy about the atmospheric system, and in particular the Epsom extension, which was to have three engines. In December 1846, they asked Boulton and Watt about cancelling the project, and were told that suspending the supply contract for a year would cost £2,300. The Directors agreed to this.

The winter of 1846/7 brought new meteorological difficulties: unusually cold weather made the leather flap stiff, and snow got into the tube (Note: Snow inside the tube itself might not have been serious; it is likely that compacted snow in the valve seating was the real problem.) resulting in more cancellations of the atmospheric service. A track worker was killed in February 1847 while steam substitution was in operation. This was tragically unfortunate, but it had the effect of widespread reporting that the atmospheric was, yet again, non-operational.

==== Sudden end ====
Through this long period, the directors must have become less and less committed to pressing on with the atmospheric system, even as money was being spent on extending it towards London Bridge. (It opened from Dartmouth Arms to New Cross in January 1847, using gravitation northbound and the Dartmouth Arms pumping station southbound.) In a situation in which public confidence was important, the directors could not express their doubts publicly, at least until a final decision had been taken. On 4 May 1847, the directors announced "that the Croydon Atmospheric pipes were pulled up and the plan abandoned".

The reason seems not to have been made public at once, but the trigger seems to have been the insistence of the Board of Trade inspector on a second junction at the divergence of the Brighton and Epsom lines. It is not clear what this refers to, and may simply have been a rationalisation of the timing of a painful decision. Whatever the reason, there was to be no more atmospheric work on the LB&SCR.

=== South Devon Railway ===
==== Getting authorisation ====
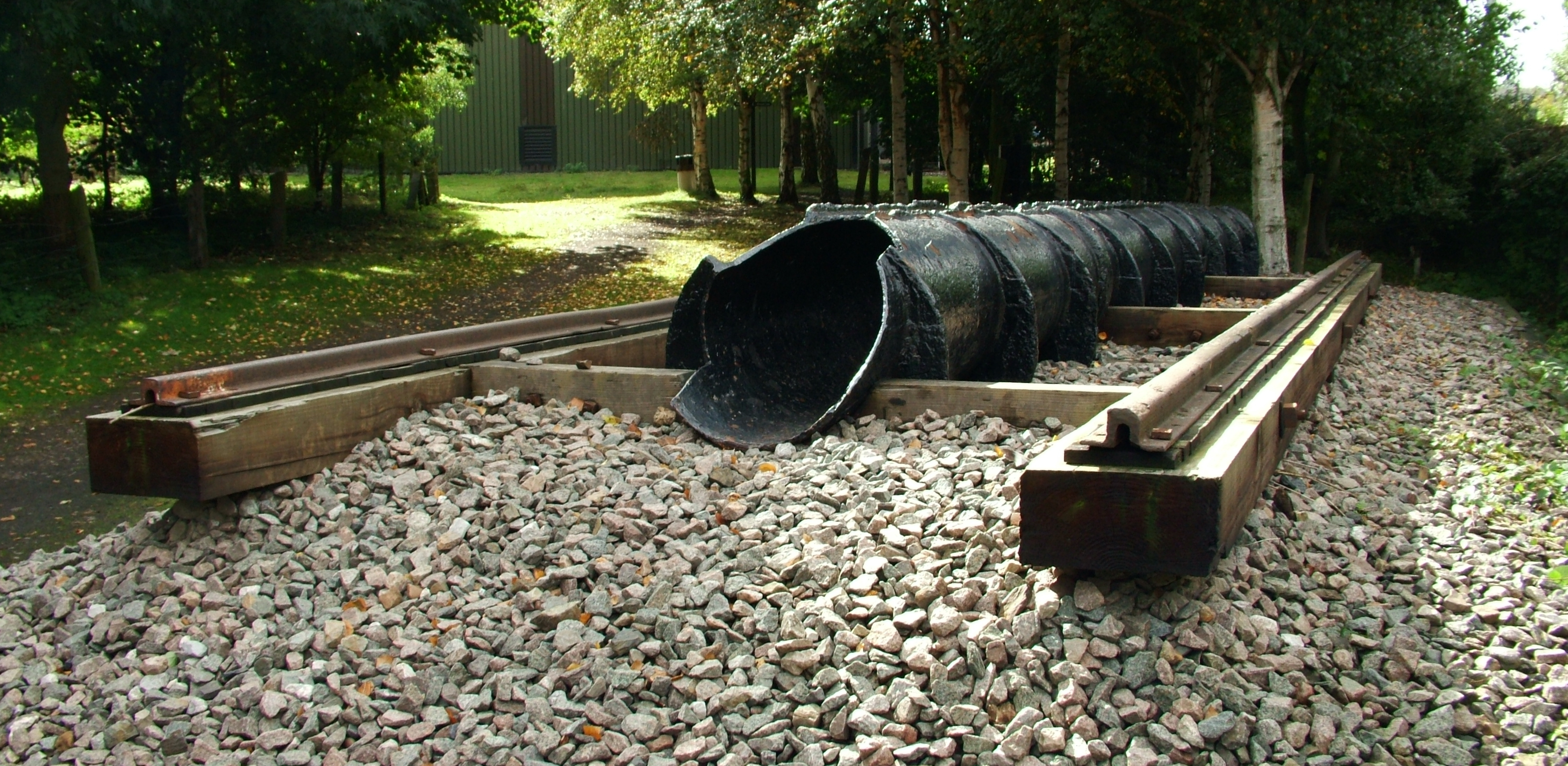
A section of the SDR's atmospheric railway pipe at Didcot Railway Centre in Oxfordshire

The Great Western Railway (GWR) and the Bristol and Exeter Railway working collaboratively had reached Exeter on 1 May 1844, with a broad gauge railway connecting the city to London. Interested parties in Devonshire considered it important to extend the connection to Plymouth, but the terrain posed considerable difficulties: there was high ground with no easy route through.

After considerable controversy, the South Devon Railway Company (SDR) obtained the South Devon Railway Act 1844 (7 & 8 Vict. c. lxvii), authorising the line, on 4 July 1844.

==== Determining the route ====
The company's engineer was the innovative engineer Isambard Kingdom Brunel. He had visited the Dalkey line and he had been impressed with the capabilities of the atmospheric system on that line. Samuda had always put forward the advantages of his system, which (he claimed) included much better hill climbing abilities and lighter weight on the track. This would enable a line in hilly terrain to be planned with steeper than usual gradients, saving substantial cost of construction.

If Brunel had decided definitely to use the atmospheric system at the planning stage, it would have allowed him to strike a route that would have been impossible with the locomotive technology of the day. The route of the South Devon Railway, still in use today, has steep gradients and is generally considered "difficult". Commentators often blame this on it being designed for atmospheric traction; for example:

Sekon, describing the topography of the line, says that beyond Newton Abbot,

the conformation of the country is very unsuitable for the purpose of constructing a railway with good gradients. This drawback did not at the time trouble Mr. Brunel, the engineer to the South Devon Railway Company, since he proposed to work the line on the atmospheric principle, and one of the advantages claimed for the system being that steep banks were as easy to work as a level.

- The line "was left with a legacy of a line built for atmospheric working with the consequent heavy gradients and sharp curves".
- Brunel "seriously doubted the ability of any engine to tackle the kind of gradients which would be necessary on the South Devon".

In fact the decision to consider the adoption of the atmospheric system came after the act of Parliament was passed, and the route must have been finalised before submission to Parliament.

Eight weeks after passage of the act, the shareholders heard that "Since the passing of the Act, a proposal has been received ... from Messrs. Samuda Brothers ... to apply their system of traction to the South Devon Line." Brunel and a deputation of the directors had been asked to visit the Dalkey line. The report went on that as a result,

In view of the fact that at many points of the line both the gradients and curves will render the application of this principle particularly advantageous, your directors have resolved that the atmospheric system, including an electric telegraph, should be adopted on the whole line of the South Devon Railway.

==== Construction and opening ====
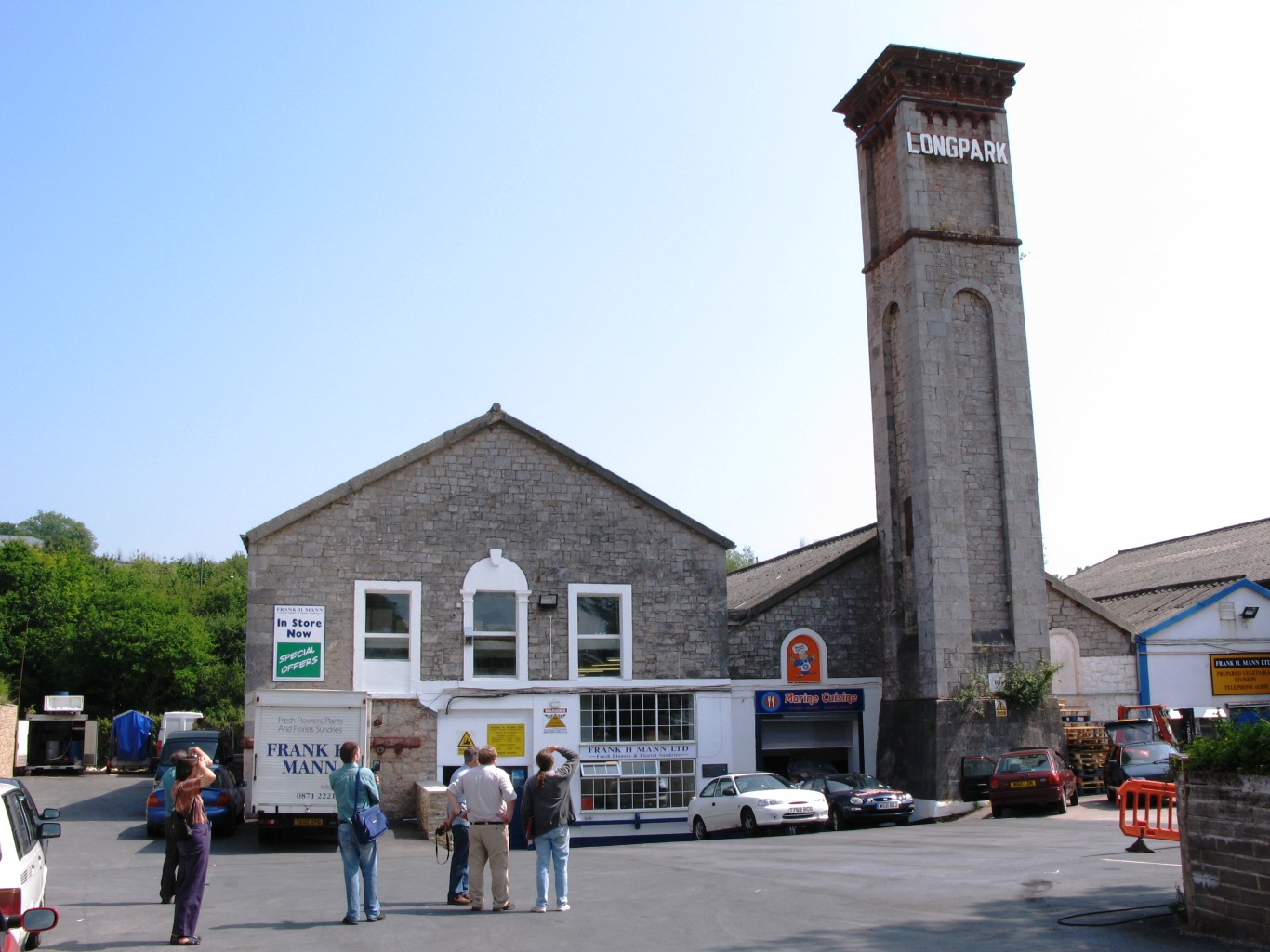
Pumping House at Torquay, Devon

Construction started at once on the section from Exeter to Newton Abbot (at first called Newton); this first part is broadly level: it was the section onwards from Newton that was hilly. Contracts for the supply of the 45 horsepower (34 kW) pumping engines and machinery were concluded on 18 January 1845, to be delivered by 1 July in the same year. Manufacture of the traction pipes ran into difficulties: they were to be cast with the slot formed, (Note: In the Dalkey case the pipes were cast as complete cylinders, and the slot was then machined in.) and distortion was a serious problem at first.

Delivery of the machinery and laying of the pipes was much delayed, but on 11 August 1846, with that work still in progress, a contract was let for the engines required over the hilly section beyond Newton. These were to be more powerful, at 64 horsepower (48 kW), and 82 horsepower (61 kW) in one case, and the traction pipe was to be of a larger diameter.

The train service started between Exeter and Teignmouth on 30 May 1846, but this was operated by steam engines, hired from the GWR. At length, on 13 September 1847 (Note: Clayton says 14 September) the first passenger trains started operating on the atmospheric system. Atmospheric goods trains may have operated a few days previously.

Four atmospheric trains ran daily in addition to the advertised steam service, but after a time they replaced the steam trains. At first the atmospheric system was used as far as Teignmouth only, from where a steam engine hauled the train including the piston carriage to Newton, where the piston carriage was removed, and the train continued on its journey. From 9 November some atmospheric working to Newton took place, and from 2 March 1848, all trains on the section were atmospheric.

Through that winter of 1847-8 a regular service was maintained to Teignmouth. The highest speed recorded was an average of 64 mph (103 km/h) over 4 miles (6.4 km) hauling 28 long tons (28 t), and 35 mph (56 km/h) when hauling 100 long tons (100 t).

Two significant limitations of the atmospheric system were overcome at this period. The first was an auxiliary traction pipe was provided at stations; it was laid outside the track, therefore not obstructing pointwork. The piston carriage connected to it by a rope—the pipe must have had its own piston—and the train could be hauled into a station and on to the start of the onward main pipe. The second development was a level crossing arrangement for the pipe: a hinged cover plate lay across the pipe for road usage, but when the traction pipe was exhausted, a branch pipe actuated a small piston which raised the cover, enabling the piston carriage to pass safely, and acting as a warning to road users. Contemporary technical drawings show the traction pipe considerably lower than normal, with its top about level with the rail heads, and with its centre at the level of the centre of the transoms. No indication is shown as to how track gauge was maintained.

==== Underpowered traction system ====
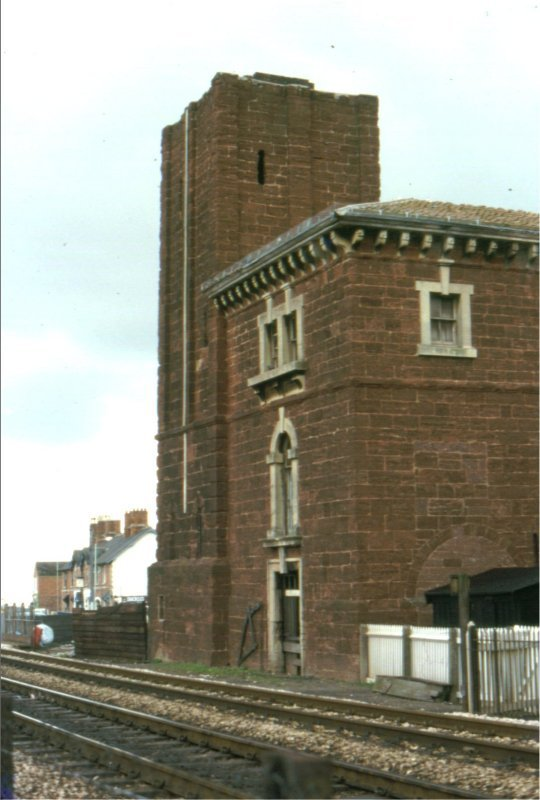
Starcross pumping house

Although the trains were running ostensibly satisfactorily, there had been technical miscalculations. It seems that Brunel originally specified 12-inch (300 mm) for the level section to Newton and 15-inch (380 mm) pipes for the hilly part of the route, and in specifying the stationary engine power and vacuum pumps, he considerably underpowered them. The 12-inch (300 mm) pipes seem to have been scrapped, and 15-inch (380 mm) pipes installed in their place, and 22-inch (560 mm) pipes started to be installed on the hilly sections. Changes to the engine control governors were made to uprate them to run 50% faster than designed. It was reported that coal consumption was much heavier than forecast, at 3s 1½d per train mile instead of 1s 0d (and instead of 2s 6d which was the hire charge for the leased GWR steam locomotives). This may have been partly due to the electric telegraph not yet having been installed, necessitating pumping according to the timetable, even though a train might be running late. When the telegraph was ready, on 2 August, coal consumption in the following weeks fell by 25%.

==== Problems with the slot closure ====
During the winter of 1847–1848, the leather flap valve that sealed the traction pipe slot began to give trouble. During the cold days of winter, the leather froze hard in frost after saturation in rain. This resulted in its failing to seat properly after the passage of a train, allowing air into the pipe and reducing the effectiveness of pumping. In the following spring and summer there was hot and dry weather, and the leather valve dried out, with a similar outcome. Brunel had the leather treated with whale oil in an attempt to maintain flexibility. There was said to be a chemical reaction between iron oxide on the pipe and the tannin in the leather. There were also difficulties with the leather cup seal on the pistons.

Commentators observe that the South Devon system omitted the iron weather flap that was used on the Dalkey line to cover the flap valve. On that line, iron plates were turned away immediately ahead of the piston bracket. It is not recorded why this was omitted in South Devon, but at speed that arrangement must have involved considerable mechanical force, and generated environmental noise.

In May and June, even more serious trouble was experienced when sections of the flap tore away from its fixing, and sections had to be quickly replaced. Samuda had a contract with the company to maintain the system, and he advised installation of a weather cover, but this was not adopted. This would not have rectified the immediate problem, and complete replacement of the leather flap was required; this was estimated to cost £32,000—a very large sum of money then—and Samuda declined to act.

==== Abandonment ====
With a contractual impasse during struggles to keep a flawed system in operation, it was inevitable that the end was near. At a shareholders' meeting on 29 August 1848, the directors were obliged to report all the difficulties, and that Brunel had advised abandonment of the atmospheric system; arrangements were being made with the Great Western Railway to provide steam locomotives, and the atmospheric system would be abandoned from 9 September 1848.

Brunel's report to the directors, now shown the meeting, was comprehensive, and he was also mindful of his own delicate position, and of the contractual obligations of Samuda. He described the stationary engines, obtained from three suppliers: "These engines have not, on the whole, proved successful; none of them have as yet worked very economically, and some are very extravagant in the use of fuel." As to the difficulties with the leather valve in extremes of weather, heat, frost and heavy rain,

The same remedies apply to all three, keeping the leather of the valve oiled and varnished, and rendering it impervious to the water, which otherwise soaks through it in wet weather, or which freezes it in cold, rendering it too stiff to shut down; and the same precaution prevents the leather being dried up and shrivelled by the heat; for this, and not the melting of the composition, is the principal inconvenience resulting from heat. A little water spread on the valve from a tank in the piston carriage has also been found to be useful in very dry weather, showing that the dryness, and not the heat, was the cause of the leakage.

But there was a much more serious problem:

"A considerable extent of longitudinal valve failed by the tearing of the leather at the joints between the plates. The leather first partially cracked at these points, which caused a considerable leakage, particularly in dry weather. After a time it tears completely through."

Maintenance of the traction pipe and the valve was Samuda's contractual responsibility, but Brunel indicated that he was blaming the company for careless storage, and for the fact that the valve had been installed for some time before being used by trains; Brunel declined to go into the liability question, alluding to possible palliative measures, but concluded:

The cost of construction has far exceeded our expectations, and the difficulty of working a system so totally different from that to which everybody—traveller as well as workmen—is accustomed, have (sic) proved too great; and therefore, although, no doubt, after some further trial, great reductions may be made in the cost of working the portion now laid, I cannot anticipate the possibility of any inducement to continue the system beyond Newton.

Huge hostility was generated among some shareholders, and Samuda, and Brunel in particular were heavily criticised, but the atmospheric system on the line was finished.

==== Retention recommended ====
Thomas Gill had been chairman of the South Devon board and wished to continue with the atmospheric system. In order to press for this he resigned his position, and in November 1848, he published a pamphlet urging retention of the system. He created enough support for this that an extraordinary general meeting of the company was held on 6 January 1849. Lengthy technical discussion took place, in which Gill stated that Clark and Varley were prepared to contract to complete the atmospheric system and maintain it over a section of the line. There were, Gill said, twenty-five other inventors anxious to have their creations tried out on the line. The meeting lasted for eight hours, but finally a vote was taken: a majority of shareholders present were in favour of continuing with the system, 645 to 567 shares. However, a large block of proxies were held by shareholders who did not wish to attend the meeting, and with their votes abandonment was confirmed by 5,324 to 1,230.

That was the end of the atmospheric system on the South Devon Railway.

==== Rats ====
It is often asserted among enthusiasts' groups that one factor in the failure of the leather flap was rats, attracted to the tallow, gnawing at it. Although rats are said to have been drawn into the traction pipe in the early days, there was no reference to this at the crisis meeting described above. Historian Colin Divall believes there to be "no documentary evidence whatsoever" for rats causing such problems on the railway.

=== Technical details ===
==== Wormwood Scrubs demonstration line ====
The piston carriage on the demonstration line was an open four-wheeled track. No controls of any kind are shown on a drawing. The beam that carried the piston was called the "perch", and it was attached directly to the axles, and pivoted at its centre point; it had a counterweight to the rear of the attachment bracket (called a "coulter").

==== Dalkey line ====
The customary train consist was two coaches, the piston carriage, which included a guard's compartment and third class accommodation, and a second class carriage, with end observation windows at the rear. There was no first class carriage. The guard had a screw brake, but no other control. Returning (descending) was done under gravity, and the guard had a lever which enabled him to swing the piston assembly to one side, so that the descent was made with the piston outside the tube.

==== Saint Germain line ====
The section put into service, Le Pecq to Saint Germain, was almost exactly the same length as the Dalkey line, and was operated in a similar way except that the descent by gravity was made with the piston in the tube so that air pressure helped retard speed. The upper terminal had sidings, with switching managed by ropes.

==== London and Croydon ====
The piston carriages were six-wheeled vans, with a driver's platform at each end, as they were double ended. The driver's position was within the carriage, not in the open. The centre axle was unsprung, and the piston assembly was directly connected to it. The driver had a vacuum gauge (a mercury manometer, connected by a metal tube to the head of the piston. Some vehicles were fitted with speedometers, an invention of Moses Ricardo. As well as a brake, the driver had a by-pass valve which admitted air to the partially exhausted traction tube ahead of the piston, reducing the tractive force exerted. This seems to have been used on the 1 in 50 descent from the flyover. The lever and valve arrangement are shown in a diagram in Samuda's Treatise.

==== Variable size piston ====
Part of Samuda's patent included the variable diameter piston, enabling the same piston carriage to negotiate route sections with different traction tube sizes. Clayton describes it: the change could be controlled by the driver while in motion; a lever operated a device rather like an umbrella at the rear of the piston head; it had hinged steel ribs. To accommodate the bracket for the piston, the traction tube slot, and therefore the top of the tube, had to be at the same level whatever the diameter of the tube, so that all of the additional space to be sealed was downwards and sideways; the "umbrella" arrangement was asymmetrical. In fact this was never used on the South Devon Railway, for the 22-inch tubes there were never opened; and the change at Forest Hill only lasted four months before the end of the atmospheric system there. A variable diameter piston was also intended to be used on the Saint-Germain railway, where a 15-inch pipe was to be used from Nanterre to Le Pecq, and then a 25-inch pipe on the three-and-a-half per cent grade up to Saint-Germain. Only the 25-inch section was completed, so a simple piston was used.

==== Engine house locations, South Devon Railway ====
- Exeter; south end of St Davids station, up side of the line
- Countess Wear; south of Turnpike bridge, at 197m 22c, down side (Note: Kay states (page 25) that MacDermot and Hadfield wrongly say that Countess Wear house was on the up side of the line.)
- Turf; south of Turf level crossing, down side
- Starcross; south of station, up side
- Dawlish; east of station, up side
- Teignmouth; adjacent to station, up side
- Summer House; at 212m 38c, down side
- Newton; east of station, down side
- Dainton; west of tunnel, down side
- Totnes; adjacent to station, up side
- Rattery; 50.43156,-3.78313; building never completed
- Torquay; 1 mile north of Torre station (the original terminal, called Torquay), up side

In the Dainton engine house, a vacuum receiver was to be installed in the inlet pipe to the pumps. This was apparently an interceptor for debris that might be ingested into the traction pipe; it had an openable door for staff to clear the debris from time to time.

=== Displays of atmospheric railway tube ===
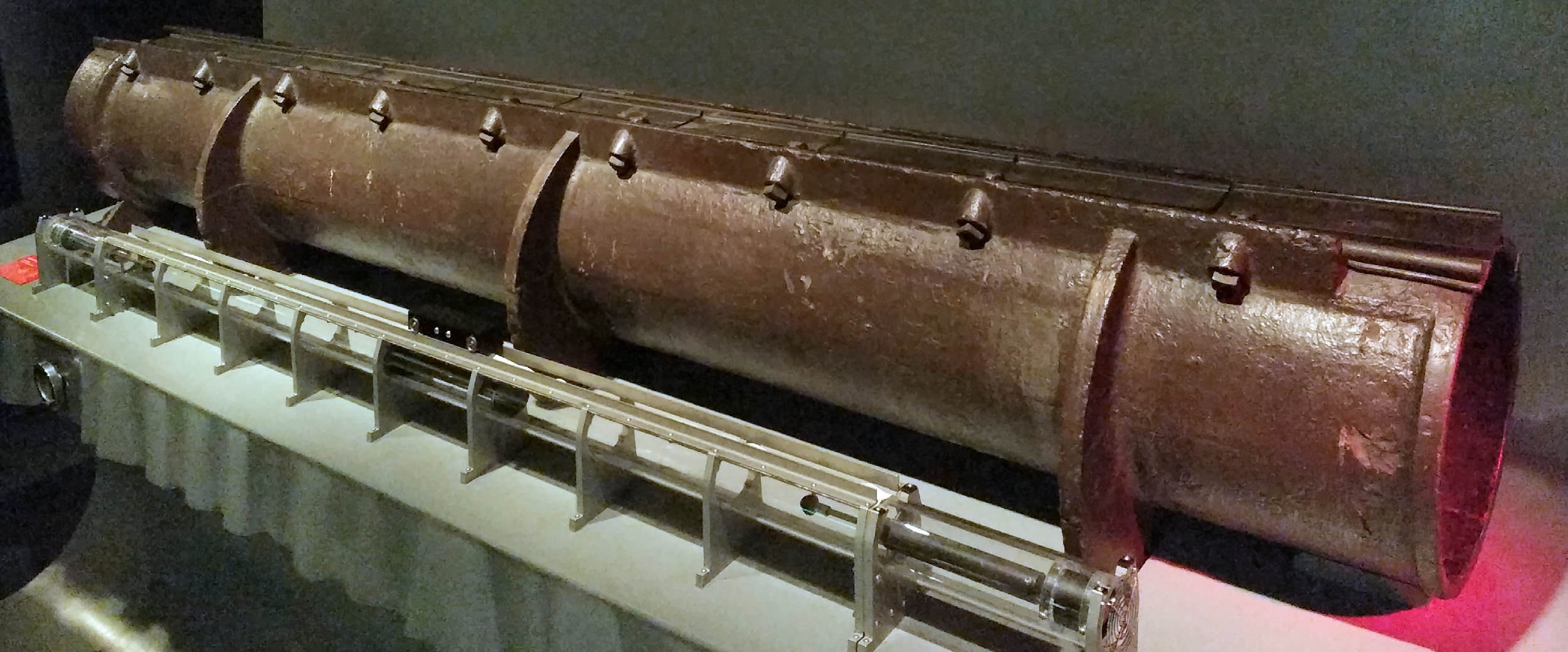
Croydon Museum, Atmospheric Railway Pipe, 1845–47

- Didcot Railway Centre, Didcot, Oxfordshire: three full lengths of unused South Devon 22-inch pipe, found under the sand in 1993 at Goodrington Sands, near Paignton, displayed since 2000 with GWR rails recovered from another source.
- "Being Brunel" exhibit, opened in 2018 at Brunel's SS Great Britain, Bristol: one full length of unused South Devon 22-inch pipe.
- STEAM – Museum of the Great Western Railway, Swindon: a very short portion of unused South Devon 22-inch pipe, probably the portion described in 1912 as on view at a Great Western Railway company museum at Paddington.
- Newton Abbot Town and GWR Museum, Newton Abbot, Devon: another very short portion of unused South Devon 22-inch pipe.
- Museum of Croydon, Croydon: one full length of London and Croydon 15-inch pipe, found in the ground in 1933 at West Croydon station.

=== Other early applications ===
Two demonstration railways were built with the entire car inside the tube rather than only a piston. In both cases the cars were pushed by atmospheric pressure in one direction and increased pressure in the other, and in both cases the object was to run cars underground without the smoke and gas of steam locomotives.

- Rammell's Crystal Palace atmospheric railway of 1864 was intended to raise interest in his proposed Waterloo and Whitehall Railway which would have run under the Thames from Waterloo Station to Great Scotland Yard. Construction on the latter started in 1865 and 1866 but did not continue.
- Alfred E. Beach's Beach Pneumatic Transit, running for one block under Broadway in New York City from 1870 to 1873, demonstrated both pneumatic operation and also a method of tunnelling that would not disturb the street surface. Air pressure was controlled by a large impeller, the Roots blower, rather than the disk fans used in all previous installations. Nothing further was ever constructed.

== Aeromovel ==
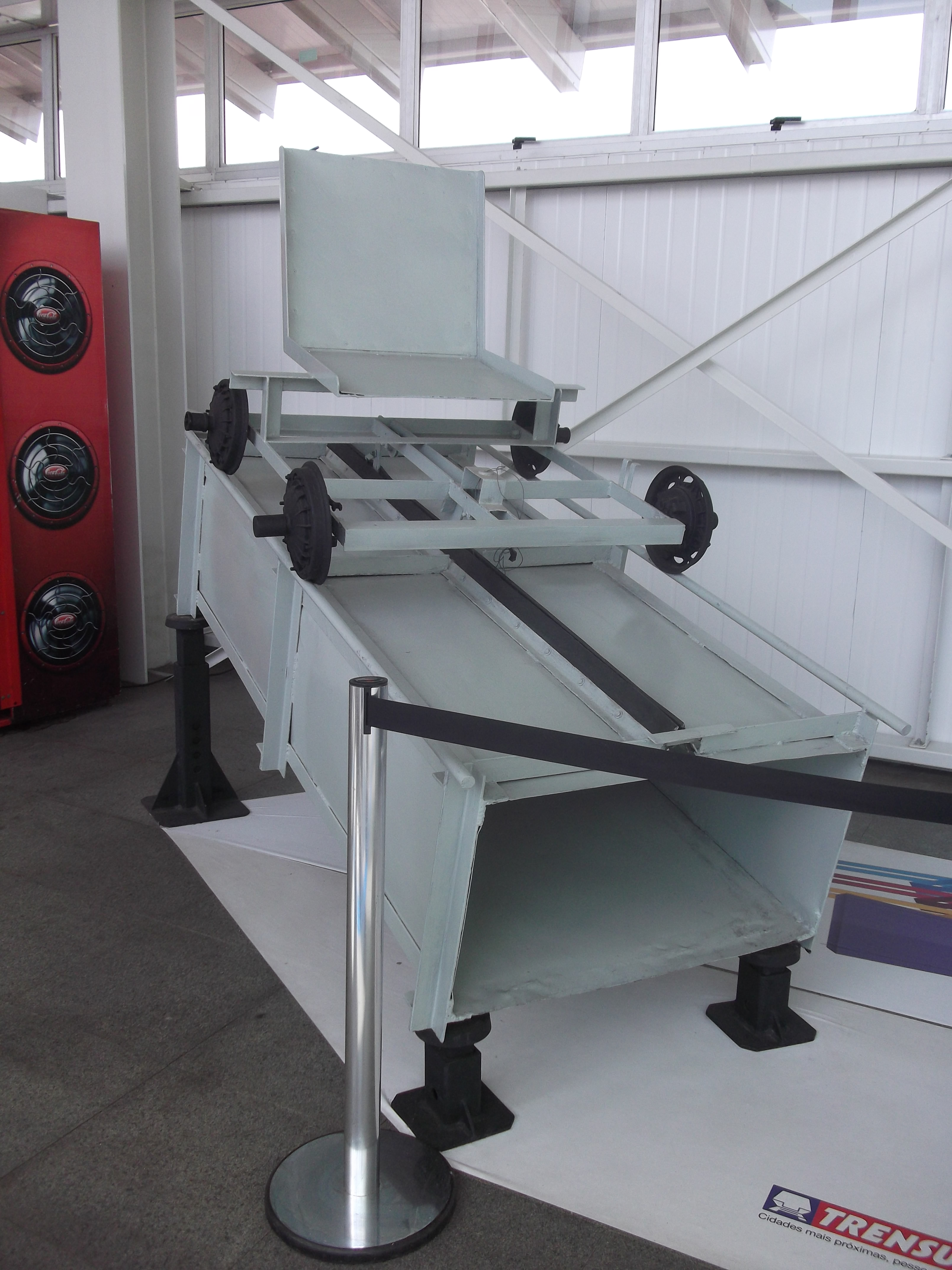
Aeromovel guideway section and bogie

The nineteenth-century attempts to make a practical atmospheric system (described above) were defeated by technological shortcomings. In the present day, modern materials have enabled a practical system to be implemented.

Towards the end of the twentieth century the Aeromovel Corporation of Brazil developed an automated people mover that is atmospherically powered. Lightweight trains ride on rails mounted on an elevated hollow concrete box girder that forms the air duct. Each car is attached to a square plate—the piston—within the duct, connected by a mast running through a longitudinal slot that is sealed with rubber flaps. Stationary electric air pumps are located along the line to either blow air into the duct to create positive pressure or to exhaust air from the duct to create a partial vacuum. The pressure differential acting on the piston plate causes the vehicle to move.

Electric power for lighting and braking is supplied to the train by a low voltage (50 V) current through the track the vehicles run on; this is used to charge onboard batteries. The trains have conventional brakes for accurate stopping at stations; these brakes are automatically applied if there is no pressure differential acting on the plate. Fully loaded vehicles have a ratio of payload to dead-weight of about 1:1, which is up to three times better than conventional alternatives. The vehicles are driverless with motion determined by lineside controls. Aeromovel was designed in the late 1970s by Brazilian Oskar H.W. Coester.

The system was first implemented in 1989 at Taman Mini Indonesia Indah, Jakarta, Indonesia. It was constructed to serve a theme park; it is a 2-mile (3.22 km) loop with six stations and three trains. In the late 2010s the system was closed. It was subsequently converted to diesel operation with a single train, and re-opened in 2019.

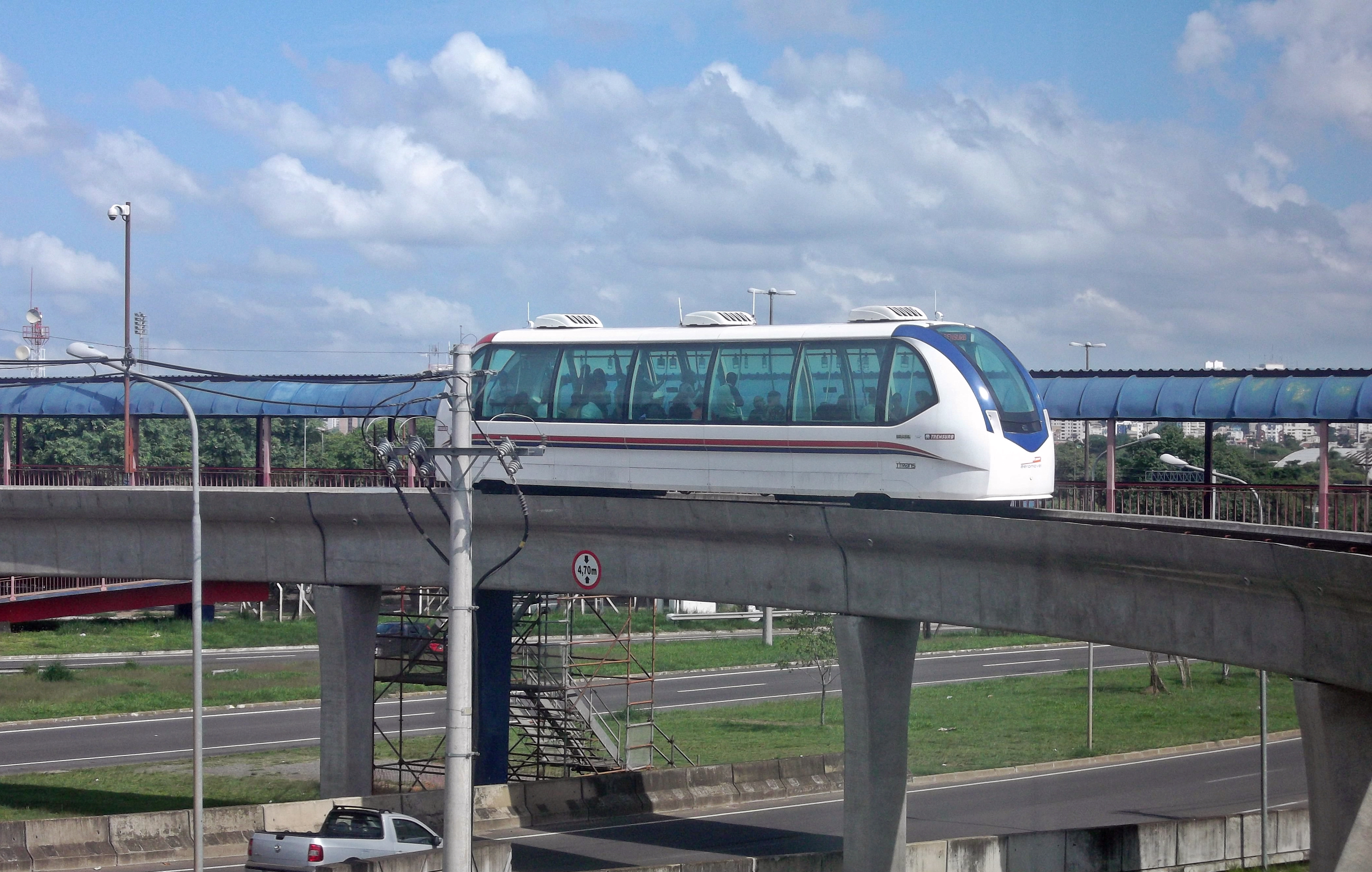
Aeromovel APM at Salgado Filho International Airport

A second installation, the Metro-Airport Connection opened in August 2013. The line connects the Estação Aeroporto (Airport Station) on the Porto Alegre Metro and Terminal 1 of Salgado Filho International Airport. The single line is 0.6-mile (1 km) long with a travel time of 90 seconds. The first 150-passenger vehicle was delivered in April 2013 with a 300-passenger second vehicle delivered later.

In December 2018 a pneumatic railway research and development centre was unveiled in China, developed by collaboration between Aeromovel and the China Railway Engineering Group (CREG). The firms had been working together on projects since the start of 2017, including a started but stalled system proposed for Canoas.

The proposed Accra Skytrain, a five line, 194 kilometres (121 mi) elevated light rail network in the capital of Ghana will also use the technology. In 2019 the government of Ghana signed a build–operate–transfer concession agreement with a South African consortium to develop the project, at an estimated cost of $2.6 billion dollars. As of June 2021 the project has not progressed passed the feasibility study stage.

In December 2020 it was announced that Aerom, which owns the Aeromovel technology, had been selected to install the GRU Airport People Mover at São Paulo/Guarulhos International Airport. The line will be 2.6 kilometres (1.6 mi) long and have 4 stations.

== See also ==
- Cable railway – a more successful albeit slow way of overcoming steep grades
- Funicular – a system of overcoming steep grades using the force of gravity on downward cars to raise upward cars
- Hyperloop
- Pneumatic tube
- Steam catapult – used for launching aircraft from ships: the arrangement of seal and traveller is similar, although positive pressure is used.
- Vactrain – a futuristic concept in which vehicles travel in an evacuated tube, to minimise air resistance; the suggested propulsion system is not atmospheric.
- Paris-Saint-Lazare to Saint-Germain-en-Laye Line
