= Porto Alegre Metro =

Rapid transit system in Porto Alegre

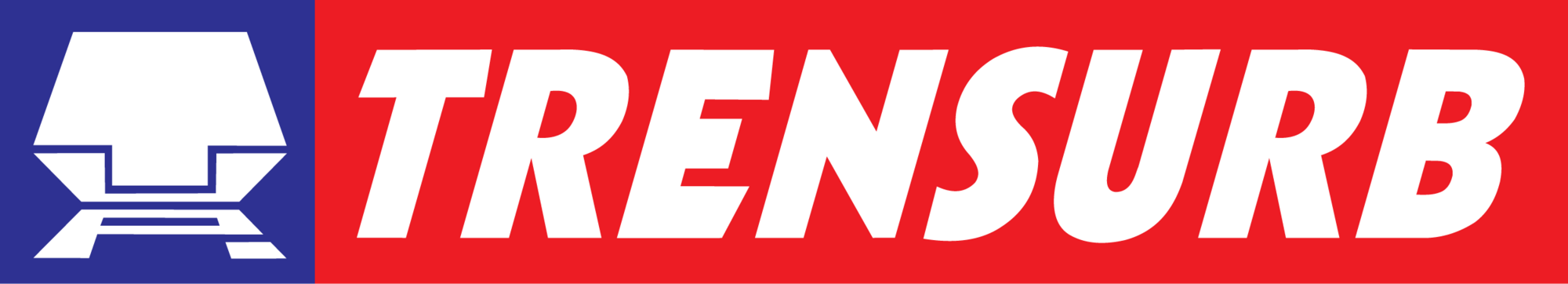

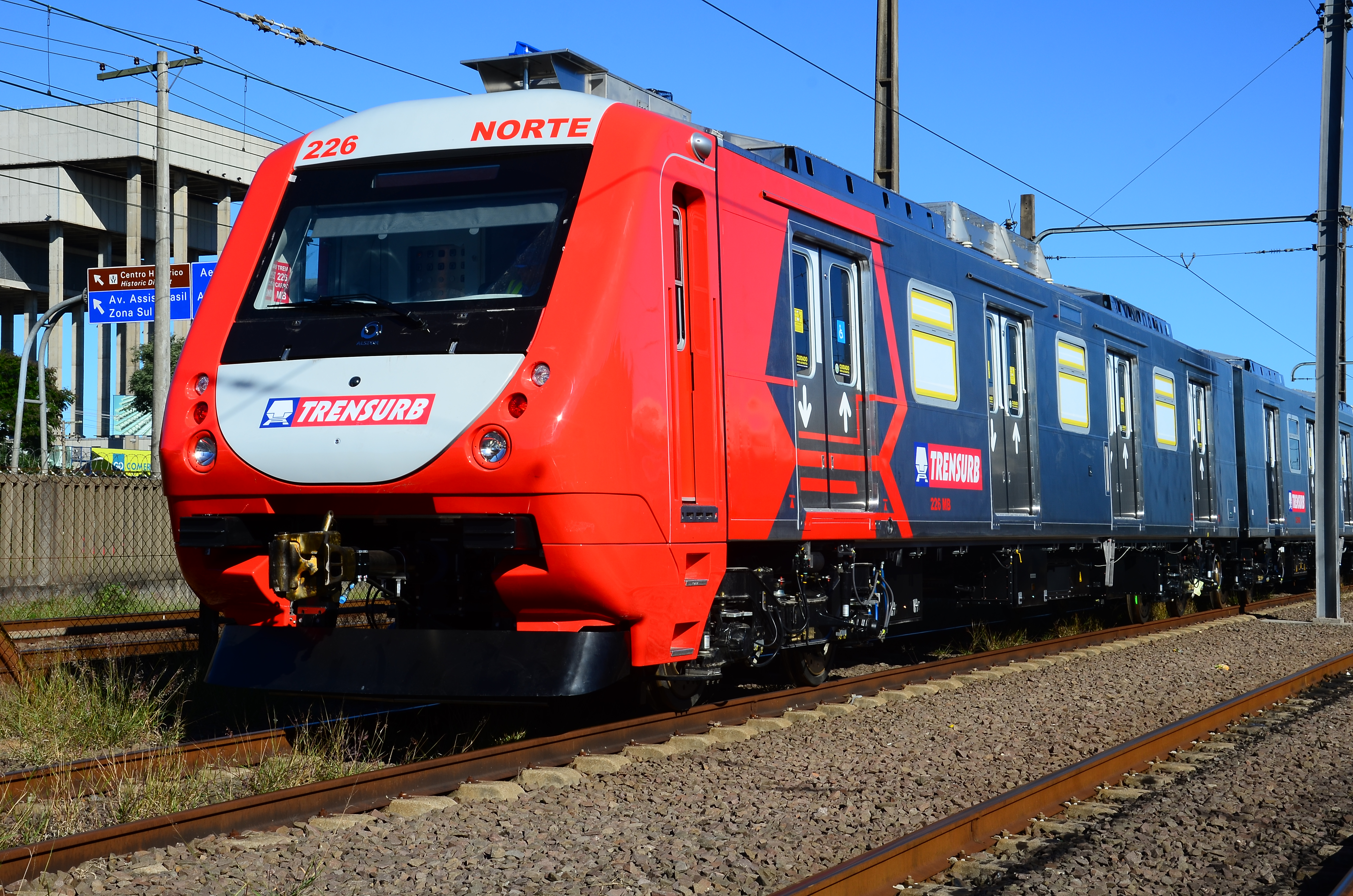

Overview
- Native name: Metrô de Porto Alegre
- Locale: Porto Alegre, Rio Grande do Sul, Brazil
- Transit type: Rapid transit
- Number of lines: 1 (+ 1 airport connector)
- Number of stations: 22
- Daily ridership: 107,742
- Annual ridership: 31.9 million (2022)
- Website: www.trensurb.gov.br

Operation
- Began operation: 2 March 1985; 41 years ago
- Operator: Trensurb

Technical
- System length: 43.8 km (27.2 mi)
- Track gauge: 1,600 mm (5 ft 3 in)
- Electrification: 3,000 V DC overhead line
- Average speed: 50 km/h (31 mph)
- Top speed: 90 km/h (56 mph)
System map

The Porto Alegre Metro (Portuguese: Metrô de Porto Alegre, commonly called Trem or Trensurb) is a transit system operated jointly by the federal government, the state government of Rio Grande do Sul and the city of Porto Alegre through the company Trensurb (Company of Urban Trains of Porto Alegre SA) in Brasil. It has 22 stations, totaling 43.8 kilometers (27.2 mi) of route, and carries about 175,000 users a day.

== History ==
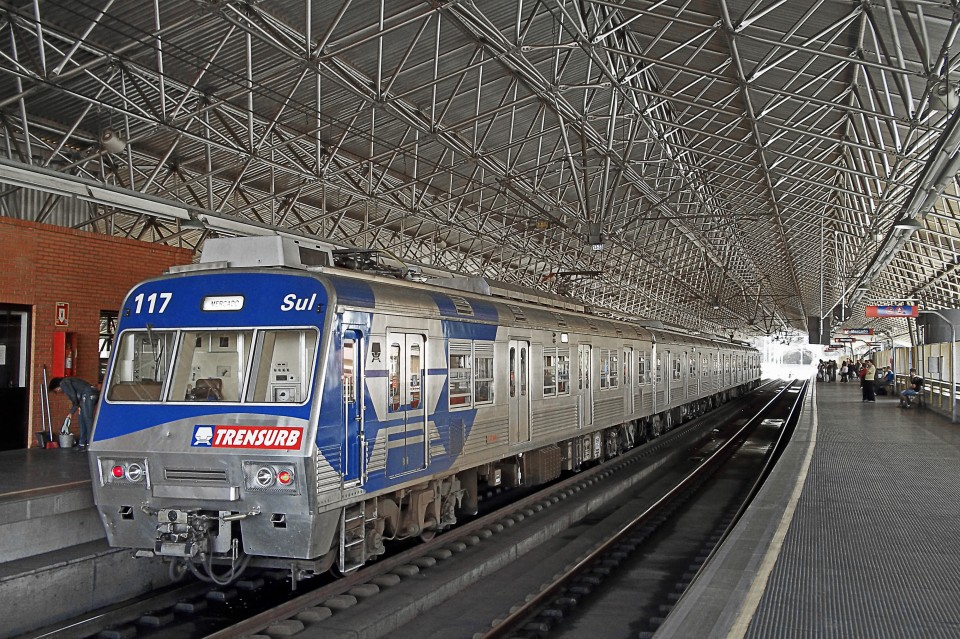
Metro in São Leopoldo Station

Line 1 of the subway built in Porto Alegre was started in 1980, linking the center of Porto Alegre to cities to the north of the metropolitan area, as Canoas, Esteio, Sapucaia do Sul, São Leopoldo and Novo Hamburgo. The route was selected to relieve the heavy traffic of highway BR-116, the only option before the construction of this line, which already had serious problems with transit at the time.

The Line 1 was inaugurated on March 2, 1985, between the Central Public Market and Sapucaia do Sul, covering a route of 27 kilometers (16.8 mi) and 15 stations.

=== Extensions ===
In December 1997, the line was extended to Unisinos. A 3.8-kilometer (2.4 mi) extension to São Leopoldo-Museum was added in November 2000, after two months of trial service.

A further 9.3-kilometer (5.8 mi) extension to Novo Hamburgo opened in two phases: a 4.9-kilometer (3.0 mi), two station stretch opened in July 2012, followed by the final 4.4-kilometer (2.7 mi), three station stretch on December 21, 2013.

== Operations ==
=== System characteristics ===
The Porto Alegre Rapid Transit has an average distance between each station of 2 kilometers (1.2 mi). The average speed of trains is 50 km/h (31 mph), while the maximum speed is 90 km/h (56 mph). The rail gauge is 1,600 mm (5 ft 3 in) (Irish gauge), with power supplied to the trains by a 3,000 VDC catenary.

=== Lines ===
Line	Start/End	Founded	Length	Stations	Time (min)	Operating Hours
1 Azul	Mercado ↔ Novo Hamburgo	1985	43.8 km (27.2 mi)	22	53	05:00 AM to 11:20 PM
Airport connection People Mover	Trensurb ↔ Infraero*	2013	0.814 km (0.51 mi)	2	2	06:30 AM to 11:20 PM

(*) Link the Trensurb's Airport Station to the International Airport Salgado Filho

==== Airport connection people mover ====
Construction of a 0.814 kilometers (0.51 mi) (including maintenance track, it is 1.01-kilometer (0.63 mi) long) single-line fully automated people mover connecting the Estação Aeroporto (Airport Station) and Terminal 1 of Salgado Filho International Airport has been completed. The line has been operational since August 2013. It is a part of the Porto Alegre Metro system so users do not need to purchase a separate ticket. The journey time is 90 seconds. Depending on demand, one or two vehicles (150 or 300 passengers), will operate at any one time. Cost of construction was R$37.8 million with demand projected at 7,700 passengers per day. In the period 1 May 2014 to 7 September 2014, following the introduction of fare collection, the service averaged 3,165 passengers per day with a peak of 4,134 on 5 September 2014.

This is the first commercial installation in the world of the Aeromovel design, an atmospheric railway technology first developed in Porto Alegre in the late 1970s.

=== Stations ===
Station	Location	Year opened
Mercado	Porto Alegre	1985
Rodoviária	Porto Alegre	1985
São Pedro	Porto Alegre	1985
Farrapos	Porto Alegre	1985
Aeroporto	Porto Alegre	1985
Anchieta	Porto Alegre	1985
Niterói	Canoas	1985
Fátima	Canoas	1985
Canoas/La Salle	Canoas	1985
Mathias Velho	Canoas	1985
São Luís/Ulbra	Canoas	1985
Petrobrás	Canoas	1985
Esteio	Esteio	1985
Luiz Pasteur	Sapucaia do Sul	1985
Sapucaia	Sapucaia do Sul	1985
Unisinos	São Leopoldo	1997
São Leopoldo	São Leopoldo	2000
Rio dos Sinos	São Leopoldo	2012
Santo Afonso	Novo Hamburgo	2012
Industrial	Novo Hamburgo	2013
Fenac	Novo Hamburgo	2013
Novo Hamburgo	Novo Hamburgo	2013

== Future expansion ==
Line 2 of the metro is proposed to consist of a 19 km (12 mi) route from the city centre to Cachoeirinha, of which around half will be underground. In 2019, the estimated cost of the line was $2.9 billion.

== See also ==
- List of metro systems
- Rapid transit in Brazil
