= AirTrain =

AirTrain may refer to:

- Airtrain Citylink, a railway infrastructure company in Brisbane, Australia
  - Airport railway line, Brisbane, known as Airtran, Australia
- AirTrain (San Francisco International Airport), serving San Francisco, California
- Operated by the Port Authority of New York and New Jersey:
  - AirTrain JFK, serving New York City's John F. Kennedy International Airport
  - AirTrain Newark, serving Newark Liberty International Airport in New Jersey
  - AirTrain LaGuardia, a proposed service to New York City's LaGuardia Airport
- Air Train (airline), a small cargo airline that became Emery Worldwide Airlines in 1990

== See also ==
- Aerotrain (disambiguation)
