= Tram Mover Garuda Kencana =

People mover at Taman Mini Indonesia Indah

Garuda Kencana Tram Mover

Taman Mini Indonesia Indah
- Status: Closed
- Opening date: April 1989 (renovated in 2021-2022)

Ride statistics
- Attraction type: People mover
- Manufacturer: Industri Kereta Api
- Speed: 15–20 km/h (9.3–12.4 mph)
- Propulsion: Air pressure (original); Diesel engine (2019-2021); Electric (2022-present)
- Length: 3.2 km
- Stations: 6

Garuda Kencana Tram Mover, formerly SHS-23 Aeromovel Indonesia, Titihan Samirono (Javanese for "wind transport") or Kereta Layang (Indonesian for "elevated train"), is an inactive people mover system at Taman Mini Indonesia Indah (TMII) in Jakarta, Indonesia. The 3.2 km system is entirely elevated with tracks situated 6 meters above the ground and loops around the park.

Originally, the trains were pneumatically propelled, using the aeromovel technology developed by Oskar H.W. Coester from Brazil. It was opened in 1989 as the world's first installation of an aeromovel system. In late 2010s, the system underwent major refurbishment, with conversion of one train to be powered by an onboard diesel engine. The train runs on the original guideway but without using the airduct. The two other trains were retired. The remodeled attraction was launched on 19 March 2019.

During the 2022 revitalization of TMII, the existing train was removed with newer ones propelled by electricity. The new units were trialed during the revitalization process and was scheduled to be commenced by 2023. However, after TMII publicly reopened in the expected year, operational remained suspended, leaving the system to be inactive until today.

== History ==
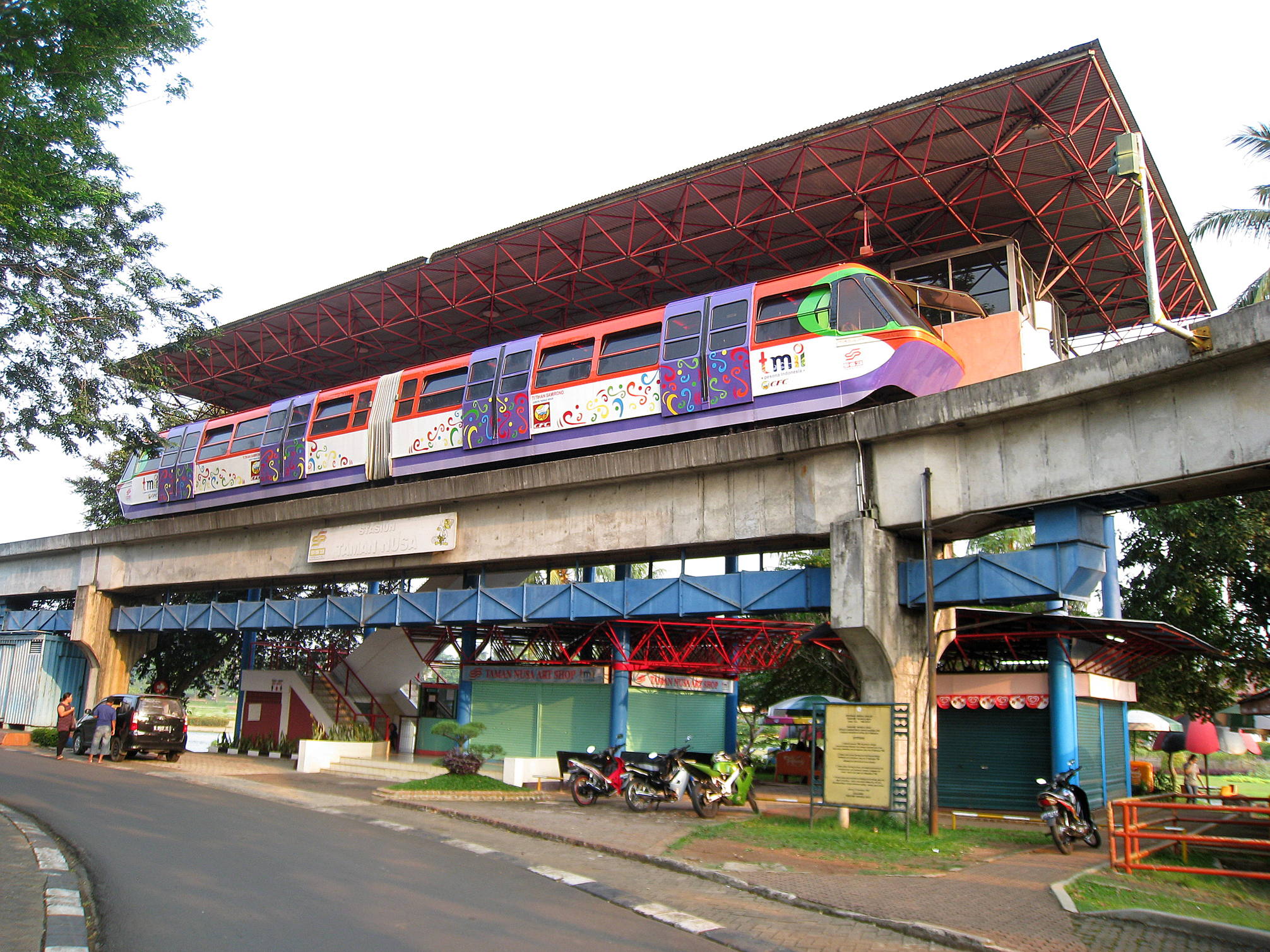
The former aeromovel train at Taman Nusa station

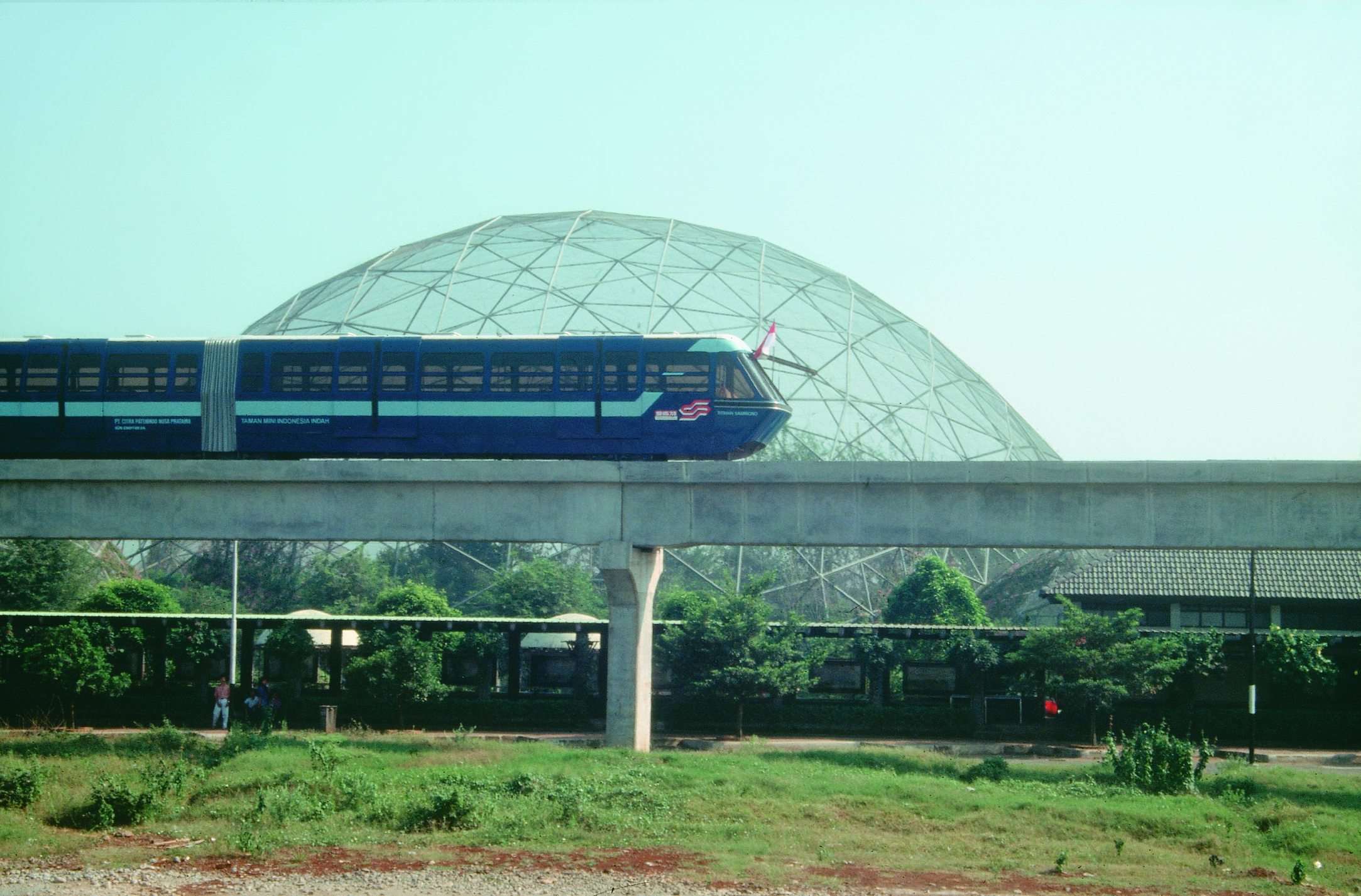
The aeromovel passing the TMII Bird Park

SHS-23 Aeromovel Indonesia was launched in April 1989. The name Titihan Samirono was given by the second Indonesian president Suharto, whose wife Siti Hartinah is the park's founder. The system was built by local contractor PT Citra Patenindo Nusa Pratama, a company owned by Suharto's daughter Siti Hardiyanti Rukmana (Tutut Soeharto).

SHS-23 Aeromovel Indonesia was considered an "advanced technology" for its time, as well as a prototype for urban public transport in the future. It is the first light rail system in the country, preceding Palembang LRT (and subsequently, specifically in Jakarta, Jakarta LRT) which were opened decades later.

As of 2014, SHS-23 Aeromovel Indonesia is only operated during the weekends (which bring a higher number of visitors and, thus, higher train occupancy), due to the large operational costs.

The system was closed temporarily on an unknown date and the Aeromovel system was replaced by a conventional, driver-controlled system and its decades-old trainsets are retrofitted. The system was relaunched on 19 March 2019 by Tutut Soeharto, this time as chairman of the then TMII operator Harapan Kita Foundation; more promoted as Kereta Layang or Titihan Samirono than "aeromovel".

Currently, the existence of the SHS-23 Aeromovel Indonesia is being replaced by an electric-powered Tram Mover made by PT INKA, which was expected to be fully operational on January 1, 2023 after the total renovation of TMII. However, until today, the operational of the Tram Mover is still not started yet without a disclosed reason.

== Operations ==
When still operating as an aeromovel, SHS-23 Aeromovel Indonesia used three single-articulated trainsets. These motorless, driverless vehicle operate in the line simultaneously. Each vehicle consists of two compartments with full internal access. Two vehicles were designed to carry 104 seated passengers and the third one was designed for 48 seated and 252 standing passengers. The vehicles has a speed of 15–20 km/h, though the vehicle actually could speed into 60 km/h. The speed is considered ideal because of the short track length and to allowing passengers to have longer time to see the panoramic view of Taman Mini Indonesia Indah more comfortably and safely.

As of 2020 there was a single, articulated, air-conditioned train operating in the system. The outer frame is unchanged, while the inner system is manufactured by INKA. The train is retrofitted with diesel engines, making it more like a diesel multiple unit. It utilized a Toyota 2GD-FTV from a 2nd generation Toyota Innova.

The new Tram Mover electric multiple units could carry 10 people, far smaller than its predecessors. Nevertheless, they are driverless and buckled with AI-powered voice guides for visitors while passing through some attractions in the park. Two units were trialed between October and November 2022.

== Stations ==
The system has six stations located across TMII:

- Taman Budaya (Culture Park): Located beside Tanah Airku Theater, Taman Budaya is the westernmost station in the system and the first station seen when the visitors visit the park. The station is close to the mini train station.
- Taman Nusa (Islands Park): Located in front of North Sumatra pavilion, Taman Nusa is situated off the coast of Indonesian archipelago lake.
- Taman Anggrek (Orchid Park): Located at nearby Maluku pavilion, Taman Nusa is situated off the coast of Indonesian archipelago lake.
- Taman Burung (Bird Park): Located in front of Taman Burung bird park, the station is close to the Pusat Peragaan Ilmu Pengetahuan dan Teknologi (Center of Science and Technology Demonstration, officially named Indonesia Science Center in English). Transfer is available to a skylift station via short walk.
- Taman Wisata (Tourism Park): Located in front of Southeast Sulawesi pavilion, the station is close to the Museum Transportasi (Museum of Transport), Museum Komodo and Taman Reptil (Reptile Park).
- Taman Bunga Keong Emas (Keong Emas Floral Park): Located off the coast of the Taman Akuarium Air Tawar (Freshwater Aquarium Park) lake, the station is close to the Taman Legenda Keong Emas (Golden Snail Legend Park) as well as Keong Emas IMAX theatre.
