= George Medhurst =

English mechanical engineer and inventor

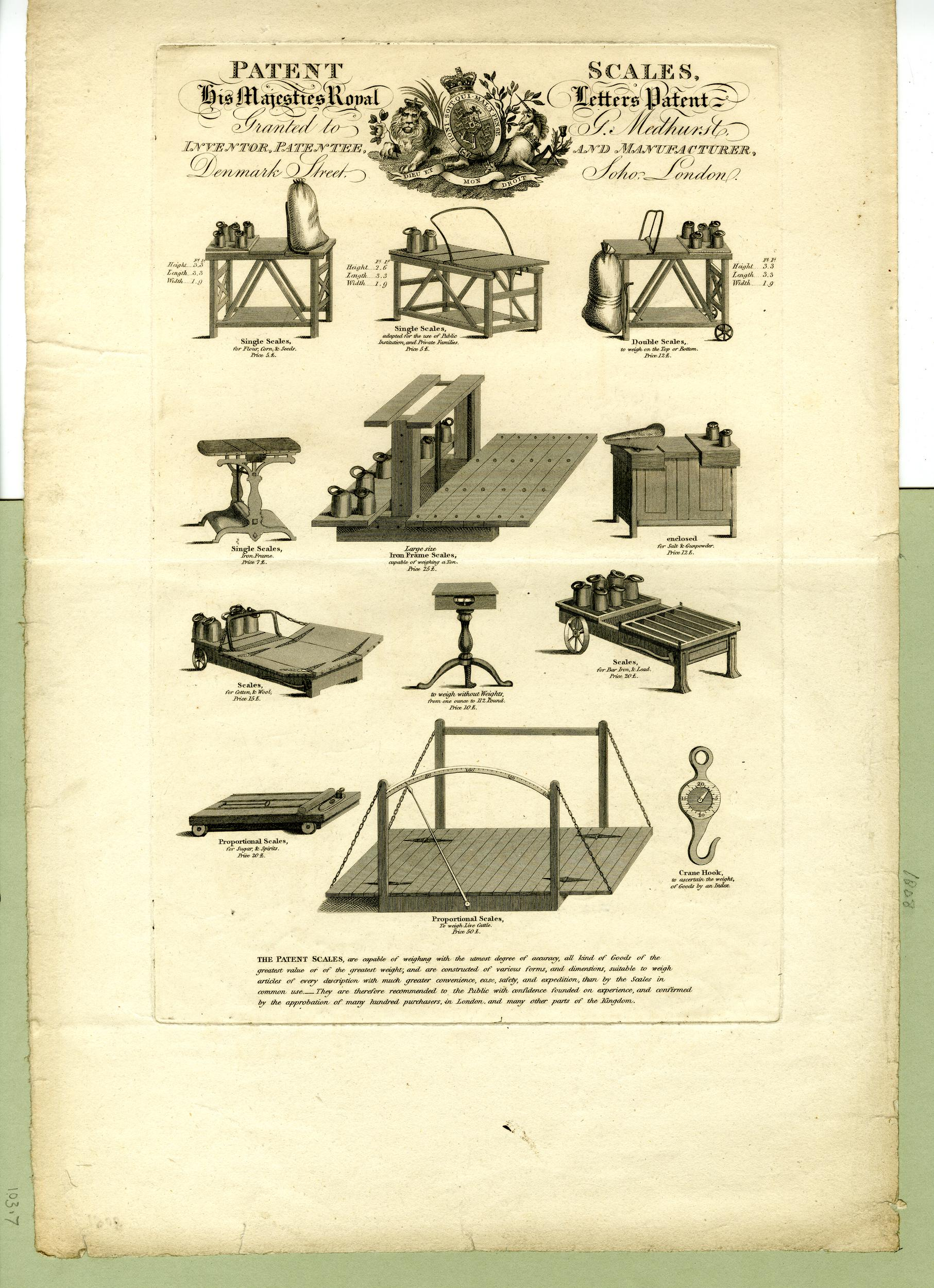
A (circa) 1810 trade card featuring the scales patented by Medhurst

George Medhurst (1759–1827) was an English mechanical engineer and inventor, who pioneered the use of compressed air as a means of propulsion. His ideas led directly to the development of the first atmospheric railway.

He was born in Shoreham, Kent and trained as a clockmaker at Clerkenwell, London, but later became interested in pneumatics.

In 1799, he filed a patent for a wind pump for compressing air to obtain motive power and the following year he patented his ‘Aeolian’ engine which used compressed air to power vehicles. In his pamphlet On the properties, power, & application of the Aeolian engine, with a plan and particulars for carrying it into execution, Medhurst proposed the establishment of Aeolian coach services, operated by pumping stations along the route.

In 1810, he published A new method of conveying letters and goods with great certainty and rapidity by air, but did not patent the idea. This was followed in 1812 by his Calculations and remarks tending to prove the practicability, effects and advantages of a plan for the rapid conveyance of goods and passengers upon an iron road through a tube of 30 feet in area by the power and velocity of air. He also envisioned carriages running on rails, propelled by a continuous tube beneath the rails, as would later happen in the atmospheric railway. Neither of these ideas was put into practical operation at the time. Shortly before his death in September 1827 Medhurst returned to the idea of pneumatic propulsion with his publication of A New System of Inland Conveyance, for Goods and Passengers ... with the velocity of sixty miles in an hour ... without the aid of horses or any animal power. [With plates.]

Other, more successful, inventions by Medhurst included a steam carriage, a ‘leak proof’ canal lock gate and a variety of weighing and balancing machines.

== Sources ==
R. B. Prosser, ‘Medhurst, George (bap. 1759, d. 1827)’, rev. Anita McConnell, Oxford Dictionary of National Biography, Oxford University Press, 2004; online edn, Jan 2008 accessed 9 Jan 2009.

Howard Turner, J.T. (1977). The London Brighton and South Coast Railway 1. Origins and formation (1st ed.). London: Batsford. ISBN 0-7134-0275-X. p. 240.
