= Aerotrain =

Aerotrain may refer to:

- Aérotrain, a hovercraft train developed in France
- Aerotrain (GM), a passenger train built by General Motors Electro-Motive Division
- AeroTrain (Dulles International Airport), an automated people mover at Washington Dulles International Airport
- Aerotrain (KLIA), an automated people mover in Kuala Lumpur International Airport, Malaysia
- Aerotrén, an automated people mover at Mexico City International Airport

== See also ==
- AirTrain (disambiguation)
