= Accra Skytrain =

Proposed elevated railway in Accra, Ghana

Overview
- Locale: Accra
- Transit type: Light rapid transit system
- Number of lines: 5

Operation
- Operator: AiSkyTrain

Technical
- System length: 194 km (121 mi)
- Track gauge: 1 metre

Accra SkyTrain was projected as a fully automated, elevated light railway metro network for Accra, Greater Accra, Ghana. The proposed network would have five routes, four of which are radial routes that originate at a new terminal at the Kwame Nkrumah Interchange, and another route that loops around the city. The total track length across all routes would have been 194 kilometres (121 mi).

The announced system was going to use the Aeromovel technology and will have capacity to carry 10,000 passengers per hour per direction on each route.

In 2018 the Government of Ghana signed a MOU with AiSky Train Consortium of South Africa. Following completion of a feasibility study, in November 2019 the parties signed a build–operate–transfer concession agreement. The company was to develop the system at an estimated cost of $2.6 billion. The government called the project a "100% private sector owned project" with no government funding.

No work has commenced and the project has been delayed due to legal questions and the coronavirus pandemic. In February 2021 the government announced it was intending to proceed but was waiting for reports from the Attorney General before submitting legislation to the parliament. By November that year it was finally revealed that it would not be made.

== 2010 monorail proposal ==
Accra Monorail was a 2010 proposal for a monorail line with 16 stations for Accra. The project did not proceed past the planning stage.
